= List of Nepenthes species =

Plant species

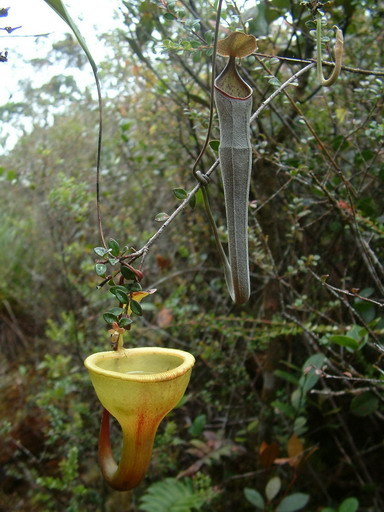
Sympatric upper pitchers of N. jamban (left) and N. lingulata (right) in Sumatran upper montane forest

This list of Nepenthes species is a comprehensive listing of all known species of the carnivorous plant genus Nepenthes. It includes 179 recognised extant species, 2 incompletely diagnosed taxa, and 3 nothospecies. Three possible extinct species are also covered.

The official IUCN conservation status of each species is taken from the latest edition of the IUCN Red List. Unofficial assessments based on the IUCN criteria are also included, but are presented in italics. Unless otherwise noted, taxonomic determinations and all other information are sourced from Stewart McPherson's two-volume Pitcher Plants of the Old World, published in 2009. Where recent literature provides an altitudinal distribution that falls outside the range given in Pitcher Plants of the Old World, the discrepancy is noted.

All major islands within a species's geographic range are included. Smaller surrounding islands are listed separately under "Minor islands", though these lists are not exhaustive. In the case of archipelagos such as the Philippines, the individual islands to which the species is native are shown in brackets.

Authorities are presented in the form of a standard author citation, using abbreviations specified by the International Plant Names Index. Years given denote the year of the species's formal publication under the current name, thus excluding the earlier basionym date of publication if one exists.

== Extant species ==
Species	Authority	Year	Image	Distribution	Altitudinal distribution	IUCN conservation status
Nepenthes abalata	Jebb & Cheek	2013		Philippines (Culion, Cuyo, Malalison)	0–20 m	Least Concern
Nepenthes abgracilis	Jebb & Cheek	2013		Philippines (Mindanao)	670 m	Critically Endangered
Nepenthes adnata	Tamin & M.Hotta ex Schlauer	1994		Sumatra	600–1,200 m	Endangered
Nepenthes aenigma	Nuytemans, W.Suarez & Calaramo	2016		Philippines (Luzon)	c. 1,200 m	Data Deficient
Nepenthes alata	Blanco	1837		Philippines (Luzon) (Note: Under the narrow circumscription of Cheek & Jebb (2013), N. alata is restricted to northern Luzon, with the more southerly plants previously referred to this species actually representing N. graciliflora, N. negros, and N. ramos. This N. alata sensu stricto has an altitudinal distribution of 550 m and above.)	550–? m	Least Concern
Nepenthes alba	Ridl.	1924		Peninsular Malaysia	1,600–2,187 m	Least Concern
Nepenthes albomarginata	T.Lobb ex Lindl.	1849		Borneo, Peninsular Malaysia, Sumatra Minor islands: Nias, Penang	0–1,100 m (Note: Adam, Wilcock & Swaine (1992) give an upper altitudinal limit of 1200 m for N. albomarginata.)	Least Concern
Nepenthes alfredoi	V.B.Amoroso, N.E.Lagunday, F.P. Coritico & R.D.Colong	2017		Philippines (Mindanao)	160–345 m	Critically Endangered
Nepenthes alzapan	Jebb & Cheek	2013		Philippines (Luzon)	1,800 m	Data Deficient
Nepenthes ampullaria	Jack	1835		Borneo, Maluku Islands, New Guinea, Peninsular Malaysia, Singapore, Sumatra, Thailand Minor islands: Bangka Belitung Islands (Bangka), Bengkalis, Ko Lanta, Ko Tarutao, Langkawi, Mendol, Mentawai Islands (Siberut), Meranti Islands (Padang, Rangsang, Tebing Tinggi), Nias, Penang, Riau Islands (Lingga Islands, Natuna Islands, Riau Archipelago), Rupat	0–2,100 m	Least Concern
Nepenthes andamana	M.Catal.	2010		Thailand	0–50 m	
Nepenthes angasanensis	Maulder, D.Schub., B.R.Salmon & B.Quinn	1999		Sumatra	2,200–2,800 m	Least Concern
Nepenthes appendiculata	Chi.C.Lee, Bourke, Rembold, W.Taylor & S.T.Yeo	2011		Borneo	1,450–1,700 m	Least Concern
Nepenthes argentii	Jebb & Cheek	1997		Philippines (Sibuyan)	1,400–1,900 m	Vulnerable
Nepenthes aristolochioides	Jebb & Cheek	1997		Sumatra	1,800–2,500 m	Critically Endangered
Nepenthes armin	Jebb & Cheek	2014		Philippines (Sibuyan)	750 m	Least Concern
Nepenthes attenboroughii	A.S.Rob., S.McPherson & V.B.Heinrich	2009		Philippines (Palawan)	1,450–1,726 m	Critically Endangered
Nepenthes batik	Mey, François, et al.	2025		Fraser's Hill, Malaysia	1,300–1,500 m	Endangered
Nepenthes barcelonae	Tandang & Cheek	2015		Philippines (Luzon)	1,500–1,700 m	Critically Endangered
Nepenthes beccariana	Macfarl.	1908		Nias, Sumatra?	unknown (0–<800 m)	Data Deficient
Nepenthes bellii	K.Kondo	1969		Philippines (Dinagat, Mindanao)	0–800 m	Least Concern
Nepenthes benstonei	C.Clarke	1999		Peninsular Malaysia	150–1,350 m	Data Deficient
Nepenthes berbulu	H.L.Tan, G.Lim, Mey, Golos, Wistuba, S.McPherson & A.S.Rob.	2023		Peninsular Malaysia	1,400–2,100 m	Endangered
Nepenthes biak	Jebb & Cheek	2018		Schouten Islands (Biak)	sea level	Critically Endangered
Nepenthes bicalcarata	Hook.f.	1873		Borneo	0–950 m (c. 1,600 m?) (Note: Adam, Wilcock & Swaine (1992) cite a record of N. bicalcarata from Mount Periok in Brunei at c. 1600 m.)	Vulnerable
Nepenthes bokorensis	Mey	2009		Cambodia	800–1,080 m	Endangered
Nepenthes bongso	Korth.	1839		Sumatra	1,000–2,700 m	Least Concern
Nepenthes boschiana	Korth.	1839		Borneo	1,200–1,800 m (Note: Cheek & Jebb (2001) give a range of 780–1880 m for N. boschiana, while Clarke (1997) gives a range of 900–1880 m.)	Endangered
Nepenthes bracteosa	Suran. & Nuanlaong	2022		Thailand	710–760 m	Critically Endangered
Nepenthes burbidgeae	Hook.f. ex Burb.	1882		Borneo	1,200–1,800 m (Note: Cheek & Jebb (2001) give an upper altitudinal limit of 2250 m for N. burbidgeae, while Adam, Wilcock & Swaine (1992) give a range of 1100–2300 m.)	Endangered
Nepenthes burkei	Hort.Veitch ex Mast.	1889		Philippines (Mindoro, Panay?)	1,100–2,000 m	Conservation Dependent
Nepenthes cabanae	Lagunday, N. E. & Amoroso, V. B.	2019		Philippines (Mindanao)	1,020–1,050 m	Critically Endangered
Nepenthes calcicola	Gary W.Wilson, S.Venter & Damas	2023		Papua New Guinea	250–270 m	Vulnerable
Nepenthes campanulata	Sh.Kurata	1973		Borneo, Philippines (Palawan?)	100–300 m	Vulnerable
Nepenthes candalaga	Lagunday & V. B. Amoroso	2022		Philippines (Mindanao)	1,800 – 2,100 m	Critically Endangered
Nepenthes ceciliae	Gronem., Coritico, Micheler, Marwinski, Acil & V.B.Amoroso	2011		Philippines (Mindanao)	1,500–1,880 m	Critically Endangered
Nepenthes chang	M.Catal.	2010		Thailand	300–600 m	
Nepenthes chaniana	C.Clarke, Chi.C.Lee & S.McPherson	2006		Borneo	1,100–1,800 m	Endangered
Nepenthes cid	Jebb & Cheek	2013		Philippines (Mindanao)	770 m	Critically Endangered
Nepenthes clipeata	Danser	1928		Borneo	600–800 m	Critically Endangered
Nepenthes copelandii	Merr. ex Macfarl.	1908		Philippines (Mindanao)	1,100–2,400 m	Least Concern
Nepenthes cornuta	Marwinski, Coritico, Wistuba, Micheler, Gronem., Gieray & V.B.Amoroso	2014		Philippines (Mindanao)	~1,000 m	Vulnerable
Nepenthes danseri	Jebb & Cheek	1997		Raja Ampat Islands (Waigeo)	0–320 m	Vulnerable
Nepenthes deaniana	Macfarl.	1908		Philippines (Palawan)	1,180–1,296 m	Near Threatened
Nepenthes densiflora	Danser	1940		Sumatra	1,700–3,200 m	Least Concern
Nepenthes diabolica	A.Bianchi, Chi.C.Lee, Golos, Mey, M.Mansur & A.S.Rob.	2020		Sulawesi	2,200–2,300 m	Critically Endangered
Nepenthes diatas	Jebb & Cheek	1997		Sumatra	2,400–2,900 m	Least Concern
Nepenthes distillatoria	L.	1753		Sri Lanka	0–700 m	Vulnerable
Nepenthes domei	M.N.Faizal, A.Amin, & A.Latiff	2020		Peninsular Malaysia	850–1,000 m	Vulnerable
Nepenthes dubia	Danser	1928		Sumatra	1,600–2,700 m	Critically Endangered
Nepenthes edwardsiana	H.Low ex Hook.f.	1859		Borneo	1,600–2,700 m (Note: Cheek & Jebb (2001), Clarke (1997) and Adam, Wilcock & Swaine (1992) give a lower altitudinal limit of 1500 m for N. edwardsiana.)	Vulnerable
Nepenthes ephippiata	Danser	1928		Borneo	1,300–2,000 m (Note: Cheek & Jebb (2001) give a lower altitudinal limit of 1000 m for N. ephippiata. The species has reportedly been collected from Bukit Raya at 2000–2270 m.)	Vulnerable
Nepenthes epiphytica	A.S.Rob., Nerz & Wistuba	2011		Borneo	~1,000 m	
Nepenthes erucoides	A.S. Rob. & S.G. Zamudio	2019		Philippines (Dinagat Islands)	800–929 m	Critically endangered
Nepenthes eustachya	Miq.	1858		Sumatra	0–1,600 m	Least Concern
Nepenthes extincta	Jebb & Cheek	2013		Philippines (Mindanao)	c. 400 m	Critically Endangered
Nepenthes eymae	Sh.Kurata	1984		Sulawesi	1,000–2,000 m	Least Concern
Nepenthes faizaliana	J.H.Adam & Wilcock	1991		Borneo	400–1,600 m	Least Concern
Nepenthes flava	Wistuba, Nerz & A.Fleischm.	2007		Sumatra	1,800–2,200 m	
Nepenthes fractiflexa	Golos, A.S.Rob. & Barer	2020		Borneo	1,400–2,150 m	Near Threatened
Nepenthes fusca	Danser	1928		Borneo	300–2,500 m	Least Concern
Nepenthes gantungensis	S.McPherson, Cervancia, Chi.C.Lee, Jaunzems, Mey & A.S.Rob.	2010		Philippines (Palawan)	1,600–1,784 m	Vulnerable
Nepenthes glabrata	J.R.Turnbull & A.T.Middleton	1984		Sulawesi	1,600–2,100 m	Least Concern
Nepenthes glandulifera	Chi.C.Lee	2004		Borneo	1,100–1,700 m	
Nepenthes graciliflora	Elmer	1912		Philippines (Bohol, Leyte, Luzon, Mindanao, Mindoro, Panay, Samar, Sibuyan)	300–1,280 m	Least Concern
Nepenthes gracilis	Korth.	1839		Borneo, Cambodia, Peninsular Malaysia, Singapore, Sulawesi, Sumatra, Thailand Minor islands: Bangka Belitung Islands (Bangka, Belitung), Batu Islands, Bengkalis, Ko Lanta, Ko Tarutao, Labuan, Langkawi, Mendol, Mentawai Islands (Siberut), Meranti Islands (Padang, Rangsang, Tebing Tinggi), Musala, Nias, Penang, Phuket, Riau Islands (Lingga Islands, Natuna Islands, Riau Archipelago), Rupat	0–1,100 m (Note: Adam, Wilcock & Swaine (1992) give an upper altitudinal limit of 1700 m for N. gracilis.)	Least Concern
Nepenthes gracillima	Ridl.	1908		Peninsular Malaysia	1,400–2,000 m	Least Concern
Nepenthes gymnamphora	Reinw. ex Nees	1824		Java, Sumatra	600–2,800 m	Least Concern
Nepenthes halmahera	Cheek	2015		Maluku Islands (Halmahera)	10–760 m	Least Concern
Nepenthes hamata	J.R.Turnbull & A.T.Middleton	1984		Sulawesi	1,400–2,500 m	Least Concern
Nepenthes hamiguitanensis	Gronem., Wistuba, V.B.Heinrich, S.McPherson, Mey & V.B.Amoroso	2010		Philippines (Mindanao)	1,200–1,600 m	Vulnerable
Nepenthes harauensis	Hernawati, R.Satria & Chi.C.Lee	2022		Sumatra	1,100–1,400 m	Unassessed(?)
Nepenthes hemsleyana	Macfarl.	1908		Borneo	0–200 m	Conservation Dependent
Nepenthes higaonon	Lagunday & Amoroso	2025		Philippines (Mindanao)		Critically Endangered
Nepenthes hirsuta	Hook.f.	1873		Borneo	200–1,100 m (Note: Adam, Wilcock & Swaine (1992) give a range of 150–1500 m for N. hirsuta, while Mansur & Brearley (2008) report finding it at elevations as low as 160 m.)	Least Concern
Nepenthes hirtella	Nuanlaong & Suran.	2022		Thailand	348 - 355 m	Critically Endangered
Nepenthes hispida	Beck	1895		Borneo	100–800 m	Conservation Dependent
Nepenthes holdenii	Mey	2010		Cambodia	600–800 m	Near Threatened
Nepenthes hurrelliana	Cheek & A.L.Lamb	2003		Borneo	1,300–2,400 m	Least Concern
Nepenthes inermis	Danser	1928		Sumatra	1,500–2,600 m	Least Concern
Nepenthes insignis	Danser	1928		New Guinea	0–850 m	Least Concern
Nepenthes izumiae	Troy Davis, C.Clarke & Tamin	2003		Sumatra	1,700–1,900 m	Least Concern
Nepenthes jacquelineae	C.Clarke, Troy Davis & Tamin	2001		Sumatra	1,700–2,200 m	Data Deficient / Conservation Dependent
Nepenthes jamban	Chi.C.Lee, Hernawati & Akhriadi	2006		Sumatra	1,800–2,100 m	
Nepenthes junghuhnii	sensu Macfarl. in sched. nom.nud.	1917		Sumatra	1,220 m	Data Deficient
Nepenthes justinae	Gronem., Wistuba, Mey & V.B.Amoroso	2016		Philippines (Mindanao)	1,000–1,620 m	Vulnerable
Nepenthes kampalili	Lagunday & V.B. Amoroso	2024		Philippines (Mindanao)	2,200–2,320 m	Critically Endangered
Nepenthes kampotiana	Lecomte	1909		Cambodia, Thailand, Vietnam	0–600 m	Least Concern
Nepenthes kerrii	M.Catal. & Kruetr.	2010		Thailand Minor islands: Langkawi?	400–500 m	Least Concern
Nepenthes khasiana	Hook.f.	1873		India	500–1,500 m	Endangered
Nepenthes kitanglad	Jebb & Cheek	2013		Philippines (Mindanao)	1,800–2,100 m	Critically Endangered
Nepenthes klossii	Ridl.	1916		New Guinea	930–2,000 m	Endangered
Nepenthes kongkandana	M.Catal. & Kruetr.	2015		Thailand	0–50 m	
Nepenthes krabiensis	Nuanlaong, Onsanit, Chusangrach & Suraninpong	2016		Thailand	600–700 m	Critically Endangered
Nepenthes lamii	Jebb & Cheek	1997		New Guinea	3,200–3,520 m	Least Concern
Nepenthes latiffiana	M.N.Faizal, A.Amin & N.Dome	2020		Peninsular Malaysia	1,000-1,100 m	Vulnerable
Nepenthes lavicola	Wistuba & Rischer	1996		Sumatra	2,000–2,600 m	Critically Endangered
Nepenthes leonardoi	S.McPherson, Bourke, Cervancia, Jaunzems & A.S.Rob.	2011		Philippines (Palawan)	1,300–1,490 m	Least Concern
Nepenthes leyte	Jebb & Cheek	2013		Philippines (Leyte)	900 m	Critically Endangered
Nepenthes limiana	Wistuba, Mey, Golos, S. McPherson & A.S. Rob.	2023		Malaysia	700-2,171 m	Data Deficient
Nepenthes lingulata	Chi.C.Lee, Hernawati & Akhriadi	2006		Sumatra	1,700–2,100 m	
Nepenthes longifolia	Nerz & Wistuba	1994		Sumatra	300–1,100 m	Least Concern
Nepenthes longiptera	Victoriano	2021		Sumatra	750 - 1,600 m	Endangered
Nepenthes lowii	Hook.f.	1859		Borneo	1,650–2,600 m (Note: Cheek & Jebb (2001) give a lower altitudinal limit of 1600 m for N. lowii, while Adam, Wilcock & Swaine (1992) give a range of 900–3400 m.)	Vulnerable
Nepenthes maagnawensis	Lagunday & Amoroso	2025		Philippines (Mindanao)	2,300–2,700 m	Endangered
Nepenthes macfarlanei	Hemsl.	1905		Peninsular Malaysia	900–2,150 m	Least Concern
Nepenthes macrophylla	(Marabini) Jebb & Cheek	1997		Borneo	2,200–2,642 m (Note: The lower altitudinal limit of 2000 m given for N. macrophylla in some older sources is apparently incorrect.)	Critically Endangered
Nepenthes macrovulgaris	J.R.Turnbull & A.T.Middleton	1988		Borneo	300–1,200 m (Note: Adam, Wilcock & Swaine (1992) give a lower altitudinal limit of 250 m for N. macrovulgaris.)	Least Concern
Nepenthes madagascariensis	Poir.	1797		Madagascar	0–500 m	Least Concern
Nepenthes malayensis	A.Amin, M.N.Faizal & Dome	2020		Peninsular Malaysia (Terengganu)	800-1,000 m	Critically Endangered
Nepenthes malimumuensis	Lagunday, Acma, Cabana, Sabas & V.B. Amoroso	2017		Philippines (Mindanao)	1,000–1,020 m	Critically Endangered
Nepenthes manobo	Lagunday, Acma, Cabana, Sabas & V.B. Amoroso	2017		Philippines (Mindanao)	1,000–1,020 m	Critically Endangered
Nepenthes mantalingajanensis	Nerz & Wistuba	2007		Philippines (Palawan)	1,700–2,085 m	Least Concern
Nepenthes mapuluensis	J.H.Adam & Wilcock	1990		Borneo	7,00–8,00 m	Endangered
Nepenthes maryae	Jebb & Cheek	2016		Sulawesi	2,100 m	Vulnerable
Nepenthes masoalensis	Schmid-Hollinger	1977		Madagascar	0–400 m	Endangered
Nepenthes maxima	Reinw. ex Nees	1824		D'Entrecasteaux Islands, Maluku Islands, New Guinea, Sulawesi Minor islands: Wowoni?	40–2,600 m	Least Concern
Nepenthes maximoides	King & Cheek	2020		Philippines (Luzon, possibly Mt. Banahaw)		Critically Endangered(possibly Extinct)
Nepenthes merrilliana	Macfarl.	1911		Philippines (Dinagat, Mindanao, Samar)	0–1,100 m	Vulnerable
Nepenthes micramphora	V.B.Heinrich, S.McPherson, Gronem. & V.B.Amoroso	2009		Philippines (Mindanao)	1,100–1,635 m	Critically Endangered
Nepenthes mikei	B.R.Salmon & Maulder	1995		Sumatra	1,100–2,800 m	Vulnerable
Nepenthes mindanaoensis	Sh.Kurata	2001		Philippines (Dinagat, Mindanao)	0–1,400 m	Least Concern
Nepenthes minima	Jebb & Cheek	2016		Sulawesi	1,000–1,700 m	Vulnerable
Nepenthes mira	Jebb & Cheek	1998		Philippines (Palawan)	1,550–1,605 m	Vulnerable
Nepenthes mirabilis	(Lour.) Druce	1869		Australia, Borneo, Cambodia, Caroline Islands (Palau, Yap), China (Guangdong Province, Hainan, Hong Kong, Macau), D'Entrecasteaux Islands, Java, Laos, Louisiade Archipelago, Maluku Islands, Myanmar, New Guinea, Peninsular Malaysia, Philippines (Dinagat, Mindanao), Sulawesi, Sumatra, Thailand, Vietnam Minor islands: Babi, Bangka Belitung Islands (Bangka), Banyak Islands, Batu Islands, Bengkalis, Enggano, Ko Lanta, Ko Tarutao, Langkawi, Mendol, Mentawai Islands (North Pagai, Siberut, Sipura, South Pagai), Meranti Islands (Padang, Rangsang, Tebing Tinggi), Nias, Penang, Phuket, Riau Islands (Lingga Islands, Riau Archipelago), Rupat, Tawi-Tawi, Wowoni?	0–1,500 m	Least Concern
Nepenthes mollis	Danser	1928		Borneo	~1,800 m	Data Deficient
Nepenthes monticola	A.S.Rob., Wistuba, Nerz, M.Mansur & S.McPherson	2011		New Guinea	1,400–2,620 m	Least Concern
Nepenthes muluensis	M.Hotta	1966		Borneo	1,700–2,400 m	Least Concern
Nepenthes murudensis	Culham ex Jebb & Cheek	1997		Borneo	2,000–2,423 m	Least Concern
Nepenthes naga	Akhriadi, Hernawati, Primaldhi & M.Hambali	2009		Sumatra	1,500–2,000 m	Vulnerable
Nepenthes nebularum	G.Mansell & W.Suarez	2016		Philippines (Mindanao)	≤1,800 m	Data Deficient
Nepenthes negros	Jebb & Cheek	2013		Philippines (Biliran, Negros)		Critically Endangered
Nepenthes neoguineensis	Macfarl.	1911		D'Entrecasteaux Islands, New Guinea, Raja Ampat Islands (Misool?)	0–1,400 m	Least Concern
Nepenthes nigra	Nerz, Wistuba, Chi.C.Lee, Bourke, U.Zimm. & S.McPherson	2011		Sulawesi	1,500–2,700 m	Least Concern
Nepenthes northiana	Hook.f.	1881		Borneo	0–500 m	Vulnerable
Nepenthes orbiculata	M.Catal. & Kruetr.	2018		Thailand	sea level	
Nepenthes ovata	Nerz & Wistuba	1994		Sumatra	1,700–2,100 m	Least Concern
Nepenthes palawanensis	S.McPherson, Cervancia, Chi.C.Lee, Jaunzems, Mey & A.S.Rob.	2010		Philippines (Palawan)	1,100–1,236 m	Endangered
Nepenthes paniculata	Danser	1928		New Guinea	~1,460 m	Endangered
Nepenthes pantaronensis	Gieray, Gronem., Wistuba, Marwinski, Micheler, Coritico & V.B.Amoroso	2014		Philippines (Mindanao)	"intermediate altitudes"	Least Concern
Nepenthes papuana	Danser	1928		New Guinea	0–1,300 m	Least Concern
Nepenthes parvula	Gary W.Wilson & S.Venter	2016		Australia		Least Concern
Nepenthes peltata	Sh.Kurata	2008		Philippines (Mindanao)	865–1,635 m	Critically Endangered
Nepenthes pervillei	Blume	1852		Seychelles	350–750 m	Least Concern
Nepenthes petiolata	Danser	1928		Philippines (Mindanao)	1,450–1,900 m	Vulnerable
Nepenthes philippinensis	Macfarl.	1908		Philippines (Busuanga, Coron, Culion, Linapacan, Palawan)	0–600 m	Least Concern
Nepenthes pilosa	Danser	1928		Borneo	~1,600 m	Data Deficient
Nepenthes pitopangii	Chi.C.Lee, S.McPherson, Bourke & M.Mansur	2009		Sulawesi	1,400–1,800 m	Vulnerable
Nepenthes platychila	Chi.C.Lee	2002		Borneo	900–1,400 m	
Nepenthes pongoides	Damit, Yusof, Jumian, & A.S.Rob.	2024		Borneo	>900 m	Critically endangered
Nepenthes pulchra	Gronem., S.McPherson, Coritico, Micheler, Marwinski & V.B.Amoroso	2011		Philippines (Mindanao)	1,300–1,800 m	Critically Endangered
Nepenthes putaiguneung	Metusala, Farishy, & Jebb	2020		Indonesia (Sumatra)		
Nepenthes rafflesiana	Jack	1835		Borneo, Peninsular Malaysia, Singapore, Sumatra Minor islands: Bangka Belitung Islands (Bangka), Labuan, Riau Islands (Lingga Islands, Natuna Islands, Riau Archipelago)	0–1,200 m (Note: Adam, Wilcock & Swaine (1992) give an upper altitudinal limit of 1500 m for N. rafflesiana.)	Least Concern
Nepenthes rajah	Hook.f.	1859		Borneo	1,500–2,650 m	Endangered
Nepenthes ramispina	Ridl.	1909		Peninsular Malaysia	900–2,000 m	Vulnerable
Nepenthes ramos	Jebb & Cheek	2013		Philippines (Mindanao) Minor islands: Camiguin, other neighbouring islands	at least 670–1,400 m (Note: The paratype of N. ramos was collected at 670 m and N. kurata (which has been synonymised with N. ramos) has been recorded at c. 1400 m.)	Critically Endangered / Near Threatened
Nepenthes reinwardtiana	Miq.	1852		Borneo, Sumatra Minor islands: Bangka Belitung Islands (Bangka), Mentawai Islands (Siberut), Nias, Riau Islands (Natuna Islands)	0–2,200 m	Least Concern
Nepenthes rhombicaulis	Sh.Kurata	1973		Sumatra	1,600–2,000 m	Vulnerable
Nepenthes rigidifolia	Akhriadi, Hernawati & Tamin	2004		Sumatra	1,000–1,600 m	Critically Endangered
Nepenthes robcantleyi	Cheek	2011		Philippines (Mindanao)	~1,800 m	Critically Endangered
Nepenthes rosea	M.Catal. & Kruetr.	2014		Thailand	450–520 m	
Nepenthes rowaniae	F.M.Bailey	1897		Australia	0–80 m	Least Concern
Nepenthes samar	Jebb & Cheek	2013		Philippines (Samar)	"low elevation"	Critically Endangered
Nepenthes sanguinea	Lindl.	1849		Peninsular Malaysia, Thailand	300–1,800 m	Least Concern
Nepenthes saranganiensis	Sh.Kurata	2003		Philippines (Mindanao)	1,800–2,100 m	Endangered
Nepenthes sericea	Golos, Wistuba, G.Lim, Mey, S.McPherson & A.S.Rob.	2023		Peninsular Malaysia	1,300–2,183 m	Least Concern
Nepenthes sibuyanensis	Nerz	1998		Philippines (Sibuyan)	1,250–1,500 m (Note: Rybka, Rybková & Cantley (2005) give a range of 1200–1800 m for N. sibuyanensis, while the authors of the describing paper give a range of 1500–1800 m.)	Vulnerable
Nepenthes singalana	Becc.	1886		Sumatra	2,000–2,900 m	Least Concern
Nepenthes smilesii	Hemsl.	1895		Cambodia, Laos, Thailand, Vietnam	0–1,500 m	Least Concern
Nepenthes spathulata	Danser	1935		Sumatra	1,100–2,900 m	Least Concern
Nepenthes spectabilis	Danser	1928		Sumatra	1,400–2,200 m	Vulnerable
Nepenthes stenophylla	Mast.	1890		Borneo	800–2,600 m (Note: Mansur & Brearley (2008) report finding N. stenophylla at 400 m.)	Least Concern
Nepenthes sumagaya	Cheek	2014		Philippines (Mindanao)	1,600–2,247 m	Endangered
Nepenthes sumatrana	(Miq.) Beck	1895		Sumatra	0–800 m	Critically Endangered
Nepenthes suratensis	M.Catal.	2010		Thailand	0–200 m	Critically Endangered
Nepenthes surigaoensis	Elmer	1915		Philippines (Mindanao)	800–1,200 m (Note: Nepenthes surigaoensis may grow as high as 1750 m ("5750 feet" in the original) according to the describing author, Adolph Daniel Edward Elmer.)	Endangered
Nepenthes talaandig	Gronem., Coritico, Wistuba, Micheler, Marwinski, Gieray & V.B.Amoroso	2014		Philippines (Mindanao)	~1,000 m	Vulnerable
Nepenthes talangensis	Nerz & Wistuba	1994		Sumatra	1,800–2,500 m	Endangered
Nepenthes tboli	Jebb & Cheek	2014		Philippines (Mindanao)	1,463 m	Critically Endangered
Nepenthes tenax	C.Clarke & R.Kruger	2006		Australia	0–80 m	Least Concern
Nepenthes tentaculata	Hook.f.	1873		Borneo, Sulawesi	400–2,550 m	Least Concern
Nepenthes tenuis	Nerz & Wistuba	1994		Sumatra	1,000–1,200 m	Endangered
Nepenthes thai	Cheek	2009		Thailand	500–600 m	Endangered
Nepenthes thorelii	Lecomte	1909		Vietnam	10–20 m	Data Deficient
Nepenthes tobaica	Danser	1928		Sumatra	380–1,800 m (Note: Cheek & Jebb (2001) give an upper altitudinal limit of 2750 m for N. tobaica.)	Least Concern
Nepenthes tomoriana	Danser	1928		Sulawesi	0–500 m	Least Concern
Nepenthes treubiana	Warb.	1891		New Guinea, Raja Ampat Islands (Misool?)	0–80 m (Note: Cheek & Jebb (2001) give an upper altitudinal limit of 500 m for N. treubiana.)	Least Concern
Nepenthes truncata	Macfarl.	1911		Philippines (Dinagat, Leyte, Mindanao)	0–1,500 m	Endangered
Nepenthes ultra	Jebb & Cheek	2013		Philippines (Luzon)	1.5–40(–400?) m (Note: The upper altitudinal limit of 400 m is uncertain as it is based on the figure given on Google Earth for an "inexact grid-reference" associated with a herbarium specimen.)	Endangered
Nepenthes ulukaliana	A.S.Rob., Wistuba, Mey, Golos, G.Lim & S.McPherson	2023		Peninsular Malaysia	1,200–1,772 m	Near Threatened
Nepenthes undulatifolia	Nerz, Wistuba, U.Zimm., Chi.C.Lee, Pirade & Pitopang	2011		Sulawesi	~1,800 m	Data Deficient
Nepenthes veitchii	Hook.f.	1859		Borneo	0–1,600 m	Least Concern
Nepenthes ventricosa	Blanco	1837		Philippines (Luzon, Panay, Sibuyan)	1,000–2,000 m	Least Concern
Nepenthes vieillardii	Hook.f.	1873		New Caledonia	0–850 m	Least Concern
Nepenthes villosa	Hook.f.	1852		Borneo	1,600–3,240 m (Note: Nepenthes villosa generally grows at elevations of 2300–3240 m, but is more common at 1600–1900 m on Mount Tambuyukon. Adam, Wilcock & Swaine (1992) give an upper altitudinal limit of 3400 m for this species.)	Least Concern
Nepenthes viridis	Micheler, Gronem., Wistuba, Marwinski, W.Suarez & V.B.Amoroso	2013		Philippines (Dinagat, Samar) Minor islands: numerous unspecified islets off Dinagat		Endangered
Nepenthes vogelii	Schuit. & de Vogel	2002		Borneo	1,000–1,500 m	Least Concern
Nepenthes weda	Cheek	2015		Maluku Islands (Halmahera)	415–1,014 m	Critically Endangered
Nepenthes zygon	Jebb & Cheek	2014		Philippines (Mindanao)	1,500–1,875 m	Critically Endangered

=== Incompletely diagnosed taxa ===
The following undescribed taxa are taken from Pitcher Plants of the Old World and its supplementary volume, New Nepenthes, published in 2011.

Taxon	Image	Distribution	Altitudinal distribution
Nepenthes sp. Anipahan		Philippines (Palawan)	1,200–1,400 m
Nepenthes sp. Misool		Raja Ampat Islands (Misool)	0–30 m

=== Nothospecies ===
Matthew Jebb and Martin Cheek recognised the following three nothospecies in their monographs on the genus ("A skeletal revision of Nepenthes (Nepenthaceae)" (1997) and "Nepenthaceae" (2001)). In the recent literature, these taxa have generally been treated as natural hybrids rather than as species. Of the three, N. × kinabaluensis has the strongest claim to species status, as it grows in two large, self-sustaining populations independent of its putative parent species. These populations are reportedly true breeding. Jumaat Haji Adam and C. C. Wilcock advocated the recognition of N. × kinabaluensis as a species in a 1998 article.

Nothospecies	Parent species	Authority	Year	Image	Distribution	Altitudinal distribution	IUCN conservation status
Nepenthes × hookeriana	N. ampullaria × N. rafflesiana	Hort.Veitch ex Mast.	1881		Borneo, Peninsular Malaysia, Singapore, Sumatra	0–450 m	Least Concern
Nepenthes × kinabaluensis	N. rajah × N. villosa	Sh.Kurata ex Sh.Kurata	1984		Borneo	2,420–3,030 m	Endangered
Nepenthes × trichocarpa	N. ampullaria × N. gracilis	Miq.	1858		Borneo, Peninsular Malaysia, Singapore, Sumatra, Thailand	0–800 m	Least Concern

== Extinct species ==
Fossil pollen of various provenance, much of it originally described under the form taxon Droseridites, has been tentatively assigned to Nepenthes by several authors. The following three species were transferred to the genus Nepenthes by Wilfried Krutzsch in 1985.

Species	Authority	Year	Location	Age
Nepenthes echinatus	(Hunger) Krutzsch	1985	Europe	Palaeocene
Nepenthes echinosporus	(R.Potonié) Krutzsch	1985	Europe	Palaeocene
Nepenthes major	(Krutzsch) Krutzsch	1985	Europe	Palaeocene

Some authors consider Droseridites major and D. parvus as synonyms of Nepenthidites laitryngewensis.

Pollen from the Kerguelen Islands originally described as D. spinosus has also been interpreted as belonging to Nepenthes.

== See also ==
- List of Nepenthes species by distribution
- List of Nepenthes natural hybrids
