= List of Nepenthes species by distribution =

Global distribution of Nepenthes

This list of Nepenthes species is a comprehensive listing of all known species of the carnivorous plant genus Nepenthes arranged according to their distribution. It is based on the 2009 monograph Pitcher Plants of the Old World and, unless otherwise stated, all information is taken from this source.

Several species with an expansive geographical range are mentioned more than once. Species that are not endemic to a given region are marked with an asterisk (*).

== Philippines ==
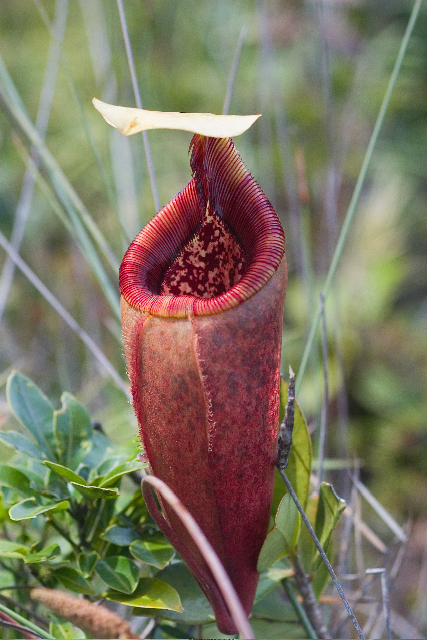
Nepenthes mantalingajanensis

Nepenthes species recorded from the Philippines.

- N. abalata
- N. abgracilis
- N. aenigma
- N. alata
- N. alfredoi
- N. alzapan
- N. argentii
- N. armin
- N. attenboroughii
- N. barcelonae
- N. bellii
- N. burkei
- N. cabanae
1. ?N. campanulata *
- N. candalaga
- N. ceciliae
- N. cid
- N. copelandii
- N. cornuta
- N. deaniana
- N. erucoides
- N. extincta
- N. gantungensis
- N. graciliflora
- N. hamiguitanensis
- N. higaonon
- N. justinae
- N. kampalili
- N. kitanglad
- N. leonardoi
- N. leyte
- N. maagnawensis
- N. malimumuensis
- N. manobo
- N. mantalingajanensis
- N. maximoides
- N. merrilliana
- N. micramphora
- N. mindanaoensis
- N. mira
- N. mirabilis *
- N. nebularum
- N. negros
- N. palawanensis
- N. pantaronensis
- N. peltata
- N. petiolata
- N. philippinensis
- N. pulchra
- N. ramos
- N. robcantleyi
- N. samar
- N. saranganiensis
- N. sibuyanensis
- N. sumagaya
- N. surigaoensis
- N. talaandig
- N. tboli
- N. truncata
- N. ultra
- N. ventricosa
- N. viridis
- N. zygon
1. N. sp. Anipahan

== Borneo ==
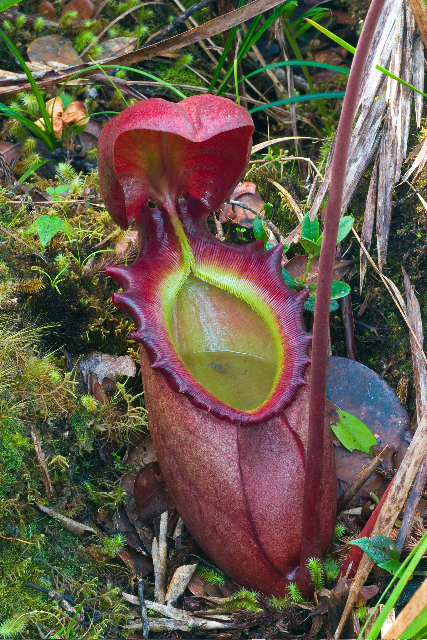
Nepenthes rajah

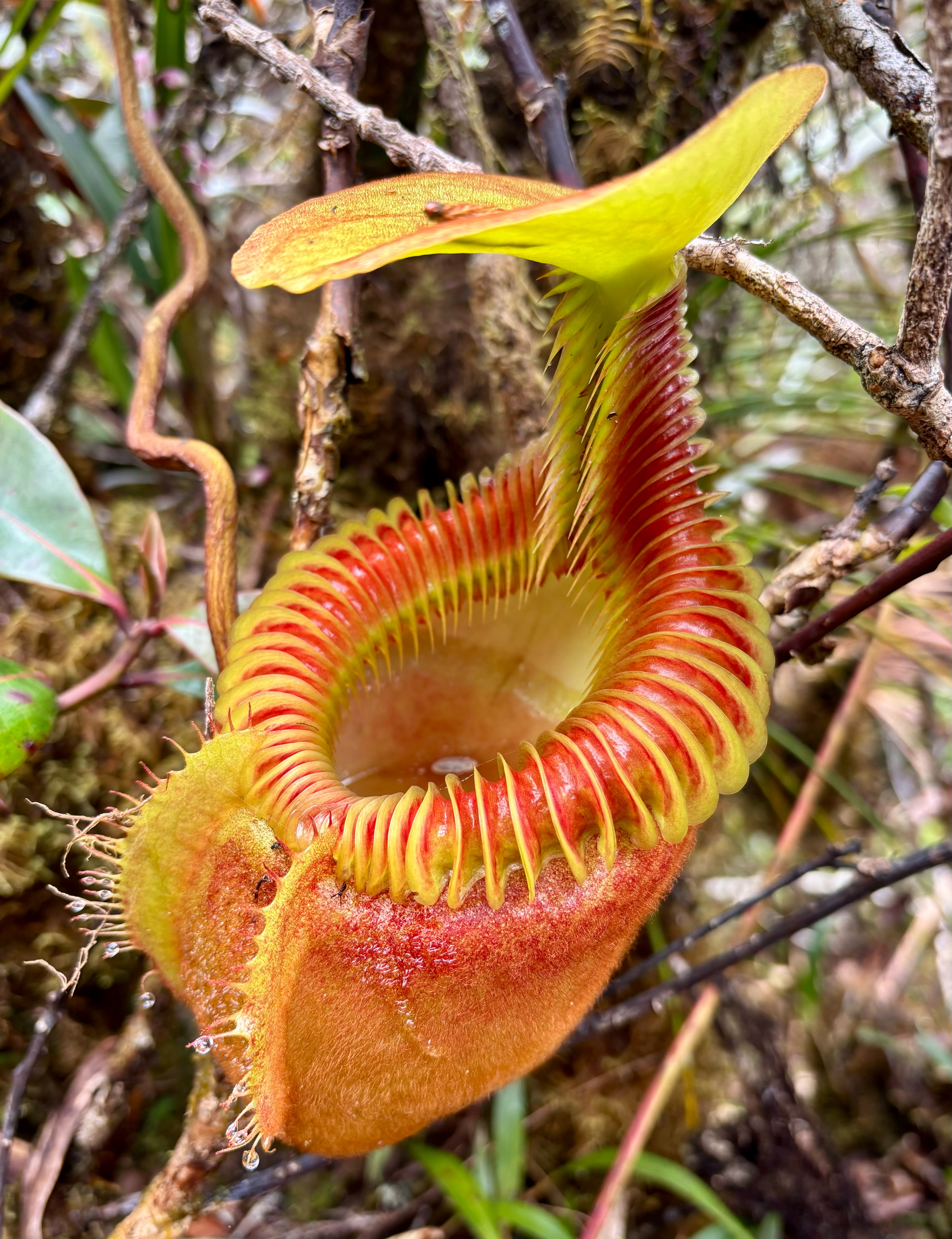
Nepenthes villosa

Nepenthes species recorded from Borneo.

- N. albomarginata *
- N. ampullaria *
- N. appendiculata
- N. bicalcarata
- N. boschiana
- N. burbidgeae
- N. campanulata *
- N. chaniana
- N. clipeata
- N. edwardsiana
- N. ephippiata
- N. epiphytica
- N. faizaliana
- N. fractiflexa
- N. fusca
- N. glandulifera
- N. gracilis *
- N. hemsleyana
- N. hirsuta
- N. hispida
- N. hurrelliana
- N. lowii
- N. macrophylla
- N. macrovulgaris
- N. mapuluensis
- N. mirabilis *
- N. mollis
- N. muluensis
- N. murudensis
- N. northiana
- N. pilosa
- N. platychila
- N. pongoides
- N. pudica
- N. rafflesiana *
- N. rajah
- N. reinwardtiana *
- N. stenophylla
- N. tentaculata *
- N. veitchii
- N. villosa
- N. vogelii

== Sumatra ==
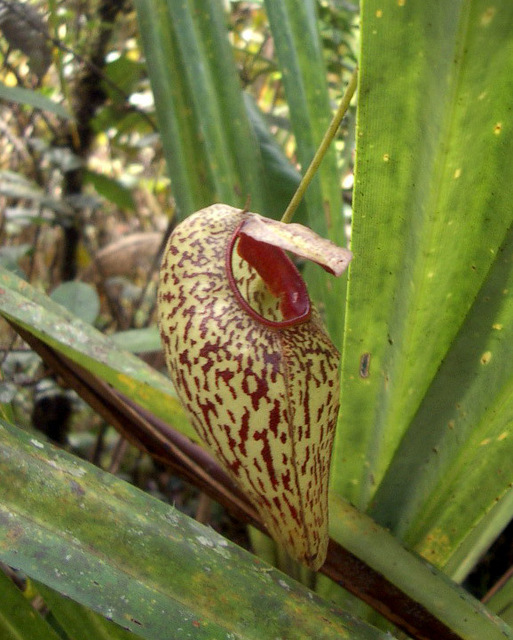
Nepenthes aristolochioides

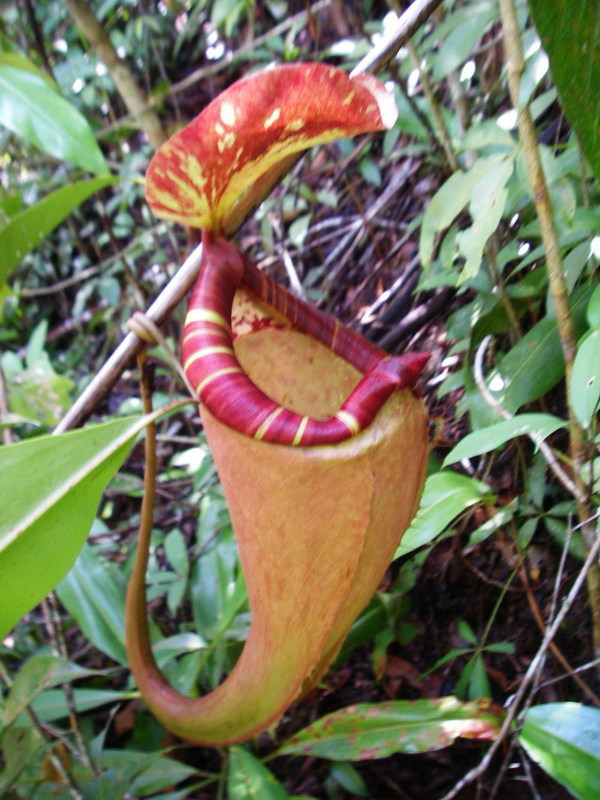
Nepenthes sumatrana

Nepenthes species recorded from Sumatra.

- N. adnata
- N. albomarginata *
- N. ampullaria *
- N. angasanensis
- N. aristolochioides
- N. beccariana
- N. bongso
- N. densiflora
- N. diatas
- N. dubia
- N. eustachya
- N. flava
- N. gracilis *
- N. gymnamphora *
- N. harauensis
- N. inermis
- N. izumiae
- N. jacquelineae
- N. jamban
- N. junghuhnii
- N. lavicola
- N. lingulata
- N. longifolia
- N. longiptera
- N. mikei
- N. mirabilis *
- N. naga
- N. ovata
- N. putaiguneung
- N. rafflesiana *
- N. reinwardtiana *
- N. rhombicaulis
- N. rigidifolia
- N. samudera
- N. singalana
- N. spathulata *
- N. spectabilis
- N. sumatrana
- N. talangensis
- N. taminii
- N. tenuis
- N. tobaica

== Peninsular Malaysia ==
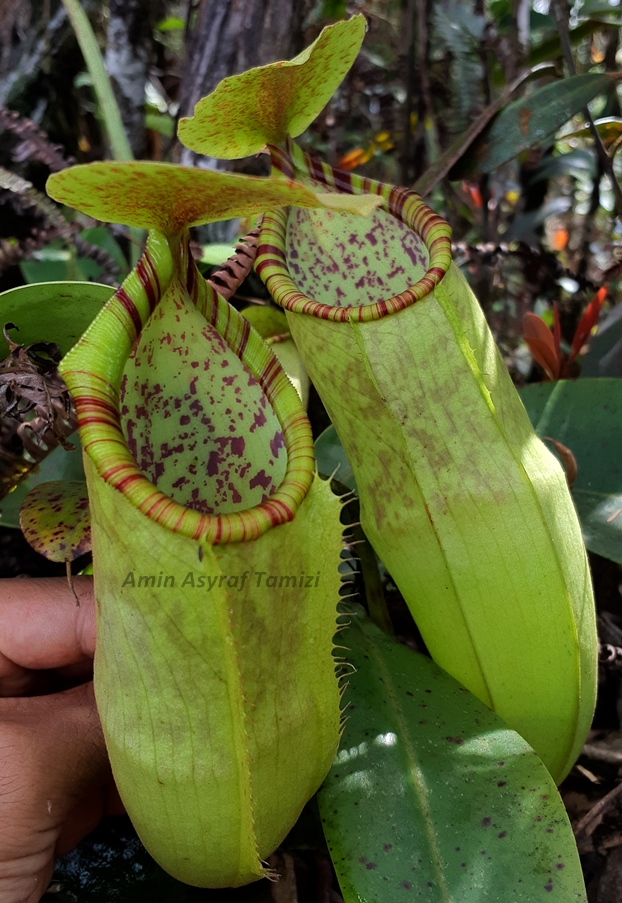
Nepenthes malayensis

Nepenthes species recorded from Peninsular Malaysia.

- N. alba
- N. albomarginata *
- N. ampullaria *
- N. benstonei
- N. berbulu
- N. domei
- N. gracilis *
- N. gracillima
- N. kerrii
- N. latiffiana
- N. limiana
- N. macfarlanei
- N. malayensis
- N. mirabilis *
- N. rafflesiana *
- N. ramispina
- N. sanguinea *
- N. sericea
- N. ulukaliana
- N. sp. Titiwangsa (pesonawangsa223)

== Sulawesi ==
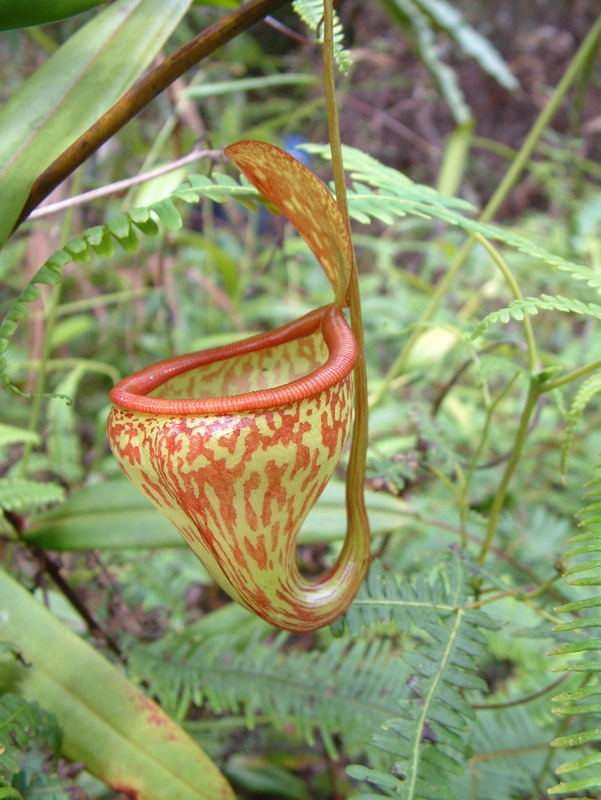
Nepenthes pitopangii

Nepenthes species recorded from Sulawesi

- N. diabolica
- N. eymae
- N. glabrata
- N. gracilis *
- N. hamata
- N. maryae
- N. maxima *
- N. minima
- N. mirabilis *
- N. nigra
- N. pitopangii
- N. tentaculata *
- N. tomoriana
- N. undulatifolia

== Thailand ==
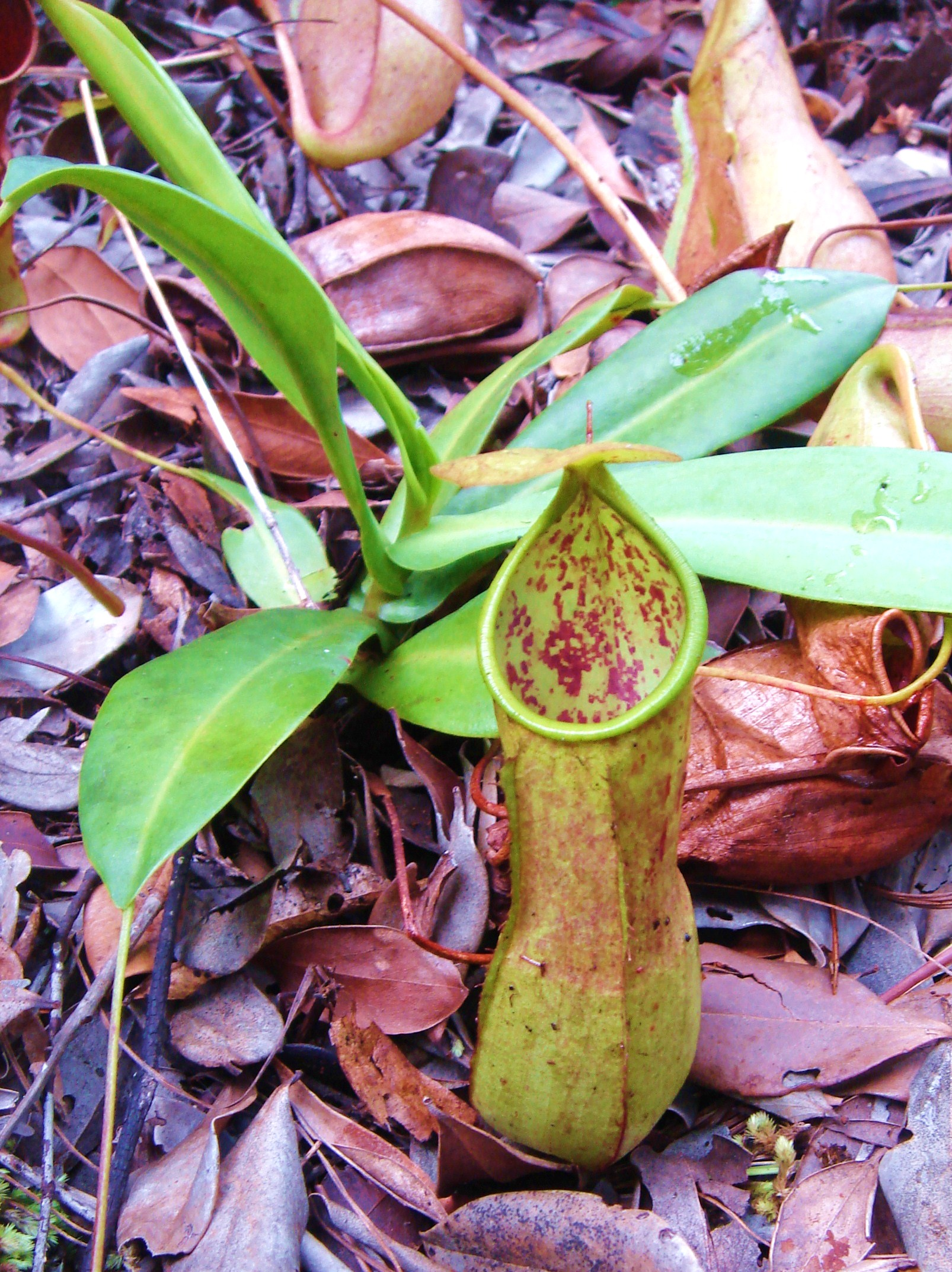
Nepenthes thai

Nepenthes species recorded from Thailand.

- N. ampullaria *
- N. andamana
- N. bracteosa
- N. chang
- N. gracilis *
- N. hirtella
- N. kampotiana *
- N. kerrii
- N. kongkandana
1. N. krabiensis
- N. mirabilis *
- N. orbiculata
- N. rosea
- N. sanguinea *
- N. smilesii *
- N. suratensis
- N. thai

== New Guinea ==
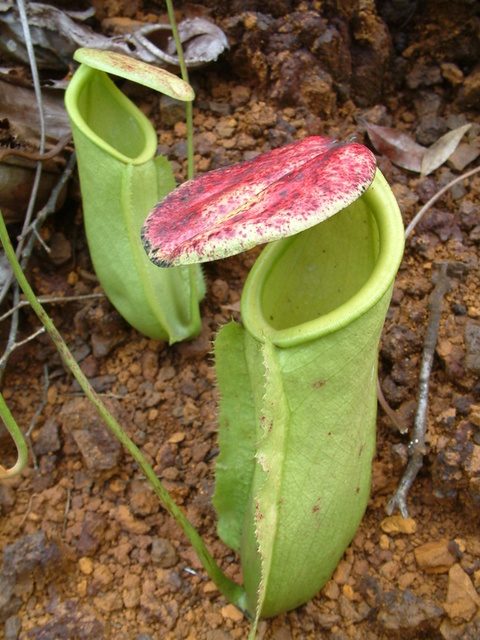
Nepenthes neoguineensis

Nepenthes species recorded from New Guinea.

- N. ampullaria *
- N. calcicola*
- N. insignis
- N. klossii
- N. lamii
- N. maxima *
- N. mirabilis *
- N. monticola
- N. neoguineensis *
- N. paniculata
- N. papuana
- N. treubiana *

== Cambodia ==
Nepenthes species recorded from Cambodia.

- N. bokorensis
- N. gracilis *
- N. holdenii
- N. kampotiana *
- N. mirabilis *
- N. smilesii *

== Maluku Islands ==
Nepenthes species recorded from the Maluku Islands.

- N. ampullaria *
- N. halmahera
- N. maxima *
- N. mirabilis *
- N. weda

== Australia ==
Nepenthes species recorded from Australia.

- N. mirabilis *
- N. parvula
- N. rowaniae
- N. tenax

== Vietnam ==
Nepenthes species recorded from Vietnam.

- N. kampotiana *
- N. mirabilis *
- N. smilesii *
- N. thorelii

== Raja Ampat Islands ==
Nepenthes species recorded from the Raja Ampat Islands.

- N. danseri
1. ?N. neoguineensis *
2. ?N. treubiana *
3. N. sp. Misool

== D'Entrecasteaux Islands ==
Nepenthes species recorded from the D'Entrecasteaux Islands.

- N. maxima *
- N. mirabilis *
- N. neoguineensis *

== Java ==
Nepenthes species recorded from Java.

- N. gymnamphora *
- N. mirabilis *
- N. spathulata *

== Singapore ==
Nepenthes species recorded from Singapore.

- N. ampullaria *
- N. gracilis *
- N. rafflesiana *

== Madagascar ==
Nepenthes species recorded from Madagascar.

- N. madagascariensis
- N. masoalensis

== Laos ==
Nepenthes species recorded from Laos.

- N. mirabilis *
- N. smilesii *

== India ==
Nepenthes species recorded from India.

- N. khasiana

== New Caledonia ==
Nepenthes species recorded from New Caledonia.

- N. vieillardii

== Schouten Islands ==
Nepenthes species recorded from Schouten Islands.

- N. biak

== Seychelles ==
Nepenthes species recorded from the Seychelles.

- N. pervillei

== Sri Lanka ==
Nepenthes species recorded from Sri Lanka.

- N. distillatoria

== Caroline Islands ==
Nepenthes species recorded from the Caroline Islands

- N. mirabilis *

== China ==
Nepenthes species recorded from China (including Hong Kong and Macau).

- N. mirabilis *

== Louisiade Archipelago ==
Nepenthes species recorded from the Louisiade Archipelago.

- N. mirabilis *

== Myanmar ==
Nepenthes species recorded from Myanmar.

- N. mirabilis *

== See also ==
- List of Nepenthes species
- List of Nepenthes natural hybrids
