= Nepenthes limiana =

Scientific classification
- Kingdom: Plantae
- Clade: Tracheophytes
- Clade: Angiosperms
- Clade: Eudicots
- Order: Caryophyllales
- Family: Nepenthaceae
- Genus: Nepenthes
- Species: N. limiana

Binomial name
- Nepenthes limiana Wistuba, Mey, Golos, S. McPherson & A.S. Rob., 2023

Species of pitcher plant endemic to Peninsular Malaysia

Nepenthes limiana is a tropical pitcher plant endemic to the northern Titiwangsa Range in Peninsular Malaysia. Nepenthes limiana was compared to Nepenthes sericea and Nepenthes sanguinea. The species differs from N. sericea by its upper pitchers being narrowly cylindrical which has an infundibular base with a pitcher hip on the lower part as compared to the wholly infundibular pitcher with a pitcher hip just below the mouth or pitchers that are basally infundibular turning cylindrical to slightly infundibular above the medial hip in N. sericea. Additionally, the narrowly oblanceolate to almost linear laminae that are slightly decurrent and the proportionally wider and bulbous peristome of the lower pitchers which are often flared and crenellated characterize this species from the sessile and oblanceolate to obovate-oblong laminae and the proportionally thinner peristome that are expanded near column only and not crenellated in N. sericea.

The species was also compared with Nepenthes sanguinea by the presence of dense indumentum of filamentous hairs that are 2 mm or less in length on the lower lid surface as compared to the glabrous lower lid surface in N. sanguinea. The narrowly oblanceolate to almost linear laminae shape that are slightly decurrent, and the proportionally wider, bulbous peristome that are often slightly flared and crenellated on its lower pitchers characterize this species from the sessile and oblong laminae as well as the proportionally thinner peristome which are rarely crenellated in N. sanguinea.

The species was known from at least 3 protected areas in Gunung Basor Forest Reserve, in Gunung Stong State Park, and in the Royal Belum State Park, however further observation is needed across its range. Hence, the species was provisionally assessed as Data Deficient.

== Distribution and ecology ==
The species was known with certainty and documented from ten peaks of the northern Titiwangsa range in the Malaysian states of Perak and Kelantan. However, it is possible that the species range may extend to southern Thailand. The elevation range of around 800 meters to 2,171 meters at the summit of Gunung Chamah is the known occurrence of the species.

== Phenology ==
Aside from the dried male inflorescence which was observed at populations in Gunung Basor in the month of August 2022, from herbarium materials (infructescences and a male inflorescence) collected from Gunung Chamah on the same month, as well as dried infructescences from Gunung Kob taken in February, the flowering period and timing in this species is unknown.

== Etymology ==
Gideon Lim Li Qian is a Malaysian Nepenthes conservationist who organised the series of expeditions leading to the revision of the N. macfarlanei group which resulted in the descriptions of several species as N. berbulu, N. sericea, N. ulukaliana, and this species. This species is thus named in his honour.
