= Nepenthes batik =

Scientific classification
- Kingdom: Plantae
- Clade: Tracheophytes
- Clade: Angiosperms
- Clade: Eudicots
- Order: Caryophyllales
- Family: Nepenthaceae
- Genus: Nepenthes
- Species: N. batik

Binomial name
- Nepenthes batik G. Lim, Golos, Mey, Wistuba & A.S.Rob.

Species of carnivorous plant

Nepenthes batik is a species of tropical pitcher plant endemic to montane forest in Peninsular Malaysia, where it has only been observed on two peaks in Fraser's Hill in the state of Pahang, where it grows at an altitude of 1,300–1,500 metres (4,300–4,900 ft) above sea level.

It appears to be closely related to Nepenthes ramispina, but has been noted for its comparatively diminutive size.

== Etymology ==
The specific epithet is derived from the Indonesian dyeing method of batik.

== Natural hybrids ==
Nepenthes batik has been recorded to hybridize with N. berbulu and may also hybridize with N. sanguinea.
