= Droseridites =

Droseridites Temporal range: Cretaceous?–Miocene
- Photomicrographs of D. echinosporus pollen taken at 1000× magnification

Scientific classification
- Kingdom: Plantae
- Clade: Tracheophytes
- Clade: Angiosperms
- Clade: Eudicots
- Order: Caryophyllales
- Family: Droseraceae (?)
- Genus: †Droseridites; Cookson (1947) ex R.Potonié (1960)

Type species
- Droseridites spinosus (Cookson) R.Potonié (1960)

Species
- Droseridites baculatus Ibrahim (1996); Droseridites echinosporus R.Potonié (1954); Droseridites major Krutzsch (1970); Droseridites parvus Dutta & Sah (1970); Droseridites senonicus Jardiné & Magloire (1965); Droseridites spinosus (Cookson) R.Potonié (1960)

Extinct genus of pitcher plant

Droseridites is a genus of extinct plants of possible droseracean or nepenthacean affinity. It is a form taxon known only from fossil pollen. Species assigned to this genus originate from numerous regions of the world, including Europe (from France to the Caucasus), India, Egypt, the Arabian Peninsula, and the Kerguelen Islands.

This genus is characterised by inaperturate and spinose pollen grains that are united in loose tetrahedral tetrads (groups of four). The grains are prolate, striate, and tricolpate. The colpi are slender and long, whereas the striae are very fine, densely packed, and situated parallel to the polar axis.

== Species ==
Droseridites spinosus, the type species, has been recorded from the Tertiary of the Kerguelen Islands and the Miocene of India, including the Warkalli Formation (Bharathi and Kundra Clay Mines, Kerala) and the Sindhudurg Formation (Mavli Mine at Redi, Sindhudurg District, Maharashtra). It is of possible nepenthacean affinity. Specimens identified in the literature as D. cf. spinosus have also been reported from Hungarian Miocene deposits.

Droseridites baculatus was described from the Ghazalat-1 Well, Qattara Depression, Egypt.

Droseridites echinosporus has been recorded from European Tertiary strata and is a member of a group of similar species that have been interpreted as belonging to the genus Nepenthes.

Sites for D. major, a possible nepenthacean species, include the Tertiary of Europe and the Palaeocene-early Eocene Rekmangiri Coalfield of Garo Hills, Meghalaya, India.

Droseridites parvus was originally described from the lower Eocene Cherry Formation of Assam, India. It has also been recorded from the Palaeocene Tura Formation of the "Retialetes emendatus zone" in Assam and the Oligocene-Neogene Dharmsala and Siwalik (Dharmsala and Nurpur areas, Kangra District, Himachal Pradesh). The species is characterised by wart-like sculpturing and is "presently impossible to interpret".

Pollen matching the description of D. senonicus has been found in formations of the Arabian Peninsula dating to as early as the Middle Cretaceous to late Upper Cretaceous, and it has been suggested that this species may represent an early palm taxon.

Unidentified Droseridites palynomorphs have been recorded from numerous sites in India, including the Miocene Cuddalore Formation (Neyveli Lignitefield, Tamil Nadu), the Palaeocene Tura Formation (Langrin Coalfield, Khasi Hills, Meghalaya), the Palaeocene Seam No. 1 (Rekmangiri Coalfield, Garo Hills, Meghalaya), and the Oligocene-Neogene Dharmsala and Siwalik.

== Taxonomy ==
Pollen of a number of species originally described under the genus Droseridites has been tentatively assigned to Nepenthes. In 1985, Wilfried Krutzsch transferred three species of the "D. echinosporus group", creating the new combinations Nepenthes echinatus, N. echinosporus, and N. major. However, at more than 40 μm in diameter, the tetrads of D. major are larger than those of any known extant Nepenthes, and within the lower range of extant Drosera tetrads. Pollen from the Kerguelen Islands originally described as D. spinosus has also been interpreted as belonging to Nepenthes.

Some authors consider D. major and D. parvus as synonyms of Nepenthidites laitryngewensis of the Palaeocene Lakadong Sandstone in Laitryngew, Khasi Hills, Meghalaya, India.
