= Nepenthes taminii =

Scientific classification
- Kingdom: Plantae
- Clade: Tracheophytes
- Clade: Angiosperms
- Clade: Eudicots
- Order: Caryophyllales
- Family: Nepenthaceae
- Genus: Nepenthes
- Species: N. taminii

Binomial name
- Nepenthes taminii Akhriadi, Tjiasm., Primaldhi, M.Hambali, Golos & S.McPherson, 2022

Species of pitcher plant from Sumatra

Nepenthes taminii is a tropical pitcher plant endemic to Sumatra.

== Distribution ==
The species is known to occur at West Sumatra from a few population, at an elevation range of 900 to 1000 meters above sea level.

== Etymology ==
The species is named after Rusjdi Tamin (1941–2005), an Indonesian, founder of Herbarium Universitas Andalas, and a well-known Nepenthes enthusiast.
