= Nepenthes samudera =

Scientific classification
- Kingdom: Plantae
- Clade: Tracheophytes
- Clade: Angiosperms
- Clade: Eudicots
- Order: Caryophyllales
- Family: Nepenthaceae
- Genus: Nepenthes
- Species: N. samudera

Binomial name
- Nepenthes samudera R.Chiu, E.Goh, D.Lim, & M.Balahadia, 2023

Species of pitcher plant found on Sumatra

Nepenthes samudera is a tropical pitcher plant from Sumatra. Nepenthes samudera was compared to Nepenthes rigidifolia. The species resembles N. rigidifolia by the peristome shape, the morphology of the leaves, and the tendril that is inserted sub-apically at the leaves. It differs however, by its much larger and more tubular pitcher with dark red as opposed to brown speckling in the pitcher body, and in possessing less rigid leaves. The species is proposed to be Data Deficient under IUCN guidelines.

== Etymology ==
The name for this species, samudera was derived from the Sanskrit word, samudra (समु􀅫, sea) which was in turn derived from sam- (सम्, together) and udra- (उ􀅫, water). Similarly, Samudera was the name of the first Islamic Sultanate wherein the name of the island of Sumatra is thought to derive its name from.

== Distribution and ecology ==
The species is known from Sumatra, possibly on exposed sandstone ridges.

== Conservation status ==
Nepenthes samudera, while already known from cultivation and from a single collection from Sumatra, has not been documented and rediscovered. This suggests that the habitat may be highly remote, possibly on exposed sandstone ridges. Additionally, although still speculative, the species may well be extinct in the wild, as with the case of several potentially extinct North Sumatran Nepenthes species i.e., N. sumatrana, N. rigidifolia, N. jamban, N. lingulata, and N. naga due to habitat destruction. Due to insufficient information, this warrants classifying N. samudera as a Data Deficient under IUCN guidelines. Finally, the future of the species in cultivation faces challenges as well due to low genetic diversity and the limited variability in the propagated clones.
