= Halijah Ibrahim =

Malaysian botanist

Halijah Ibrahim is a Malaysian botanist.

Ibrahim was awarded her doctorate by the University of Newcastle, UK in 1979. She is a professor at the Institute of Biological Sciences at the University of Malaya. She specialises in medicinal chemistry of Malaysian plants with particular interest in Zingiberaceae.

Ibrahim has also characterised and named at least 8 species of plant. These include Boesenbergia latongensis (Meekiong, Ipor & Ibrahim).

== Publications ==
Ibrahim is the author or co-author of over 30 scientific publications including:

- Yasodha Sivasothya, Chan Chee Ken Zachariah, Kok Hoong Leong, Shia Kwong Siew John, Halijah Ibrahim and Khalijah Awanga (2014) A novel heptacyclic diterpene from Alpinia pahangensis Ridley, a wild ginger endemic to Malaysia. Tetrahedron Letters 55 6163-6166
- Sri Nurestri Abdul Malek, Chung Weng Phang, Halijah Ibrahim, Norhanom Abdul Wahab and Kae Shin Sim (2011) Phytochemical and Cytotoxic Investigations of Alpinia mutica Rhizomes. Molecules 16 583-589
- Tan Siew Kiat, Richard Pippen, Rohana Yusof, Halijah Ibrahim, Norzulaani Khalid and Noorsaadah Abd Rahman (2006) Inhibitory activity of cyclohexenyl chalcone derivatives and flavonoids of fingerroot, Boesenbergia rotunda (L.), towards dengue-2 virus NS3 protease. Bioorganic & Medicinal Chemistry Letters 16 3337-3340
