= Nepenthes bracteosa =

Scientific classification
- Kingdom: Plantae
- Clade: Tracheophytes
- Clade: Angiosperms
- Clade: Eudicots
- Order: Caryophyllales
- Family: Nepenthaceae
- Genus: Nepenthes
- Species: N. bracteosa

Binomial name
- Nepenthes bracteosa Suran & Nuanlaong, 2022

Tropical pitcher plant endemic to Thailand

Nepenthes bracteosa is a tropical pitcher plant endemic to Nakhon Si Thammarat province in Thailand. Nepenthes bracteosa differs from the closely allied Nepenthes krabiensis by its shorter stem, filiform spur that are branched, the presence of axillary bud in 2-3 axils in the upper part of the flowering plant, presence of fringed wing in the upper pitcher, lid apex that are occasionally indurate and emarginate, presence of bracts on solitary flowers for both male and female inflorescences, short androphore, and 8-13 anther sacs (15-20 anther sacs in N. krabiensis).
