= Nepenthes alfredoi =

Scientific classification
- Kingdom: Plantae
- Clade: Tracheophytes
- Clade: Angiosperms
- Clade: Eudicots
- Order: Caryophyllales
- Family: Nepenthaceae
- Genus: Nepenthes
- Species: N. alfredoi

Binomial name
- Nepenthes alfredoi V.B.Amoroso, Noel E. Lagunday, Fulgent P. Coritico, Ruel D. Colong (2017)

Species of pitcher plant from the Philippines

Nepenthes alfredoi is a tropical pitcher plant endemic to the Philippines on the Mt. Hamiguitan Range on the island of Mindanao in the Philippines, where it grows at elevations of 160–345 m above sea level.

The species was compared to N. zygon. Nepenthes alfredoi can be distinguished from N. zygon as the species have both lower and upper pitchers with well-expressed fringed wings extending for some distance along the tendril, and the male and female inflorescence are two-flowered and rarely single flowered.

== Etymology ==
The specific epithet was derived to honor Alfredo Bolante Sr., a forest guard and well-trained local researcher of Mt. Hamiguitan Range Wildlife Sanctuary who first observed and collected the species.
