= Mendol Island =

Island in Indonesia

Coordinates: 0.605°N 103.215°E

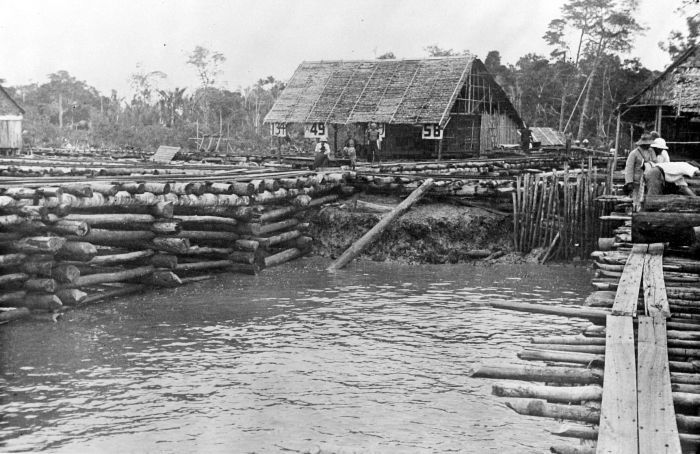
Mendol Island Facilities

Mendol Island is an Indonesian island in Pelalawan Regency of the Riau province of Sumatra. It forms a large part (45.5%) of Kuala Kampar District (kecamatan), and covers a land area of 445.12 km^{2}, consisting of seven of the district's ten villages, with a population of 13,232 in mid 2023, including the district centre administration at the town of Teluk Dalam (4,509 inhabitants). Mendol Island provides a rice mill storage area for the surrounding areas.
