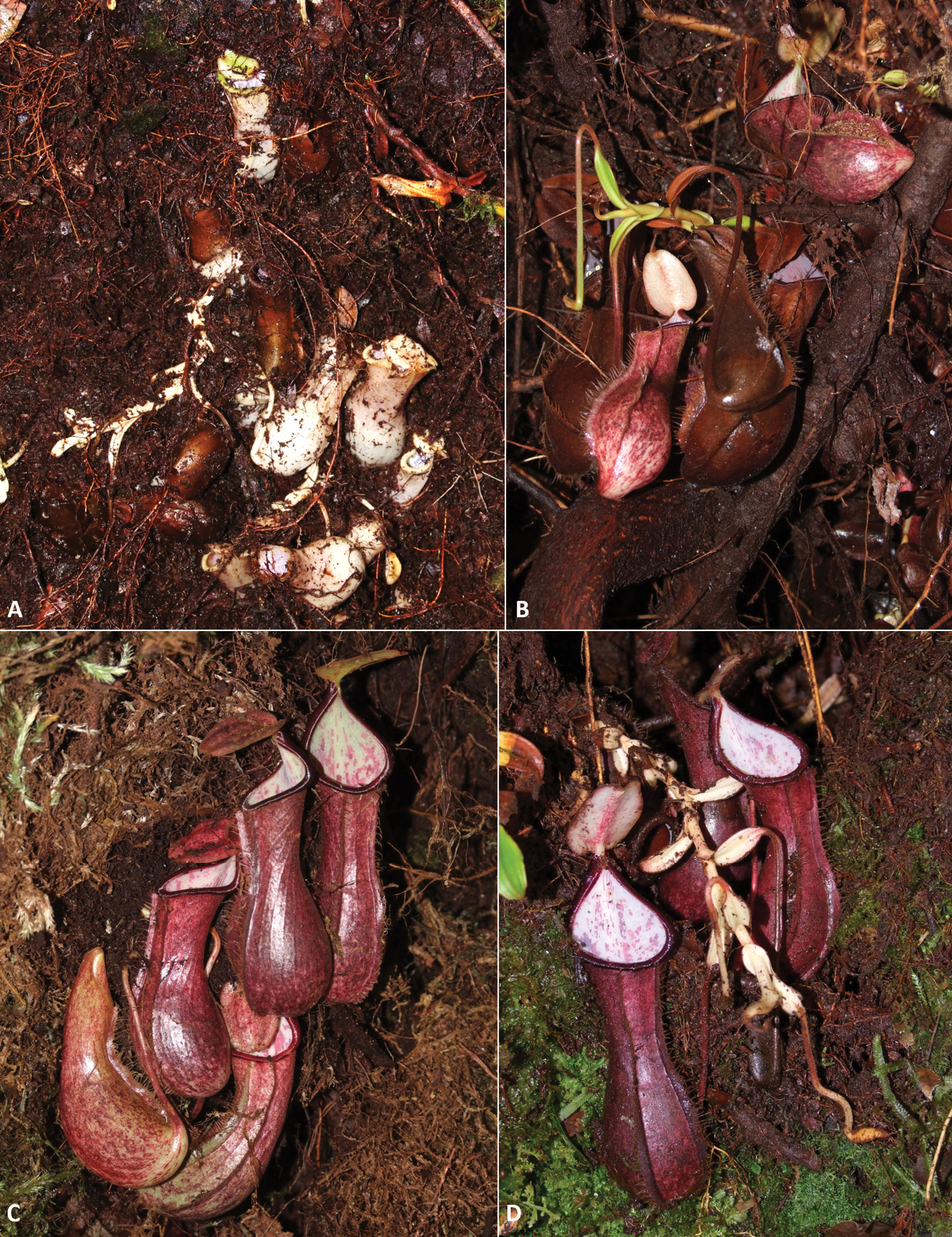

Scientific classification
- Kingdom: Plantae
- Clade: Tracheophytes
- Clade: Angiosperms
- Clade: Eudicots
- Order: Caryophyllales
- Family: Nepenthaceae
- Genus: Nepenthes
- Species: N. pudica

Binomial name
- Nepenthes pudica Dančák & Majeský (2022)

= Nepenthes pudica =

Species of plant

Nepenthes pudica is a tropical pitcher plant known from a handful of localities in the Mentarang Hulu district of North Kalimantan, Borneo, where it occurs at 1100–1300 m above sea level. It is notable for producing achlorophyllous subterranean stems bearing functional underground pitchers; very few pitchers are produced above ground.

Nepenthes pudica may have evolved its underground pitchers due to the seasonally dry ridgetops it inhabits. It appears to predominantly capture ants, as do the majority of studied species in the genus Nepenthes. Nepenthes pudica is the first described species of pitcher plant (of any genus) to use pitfall traps specifically in the subterranean environment. Morphologically, it is closest to N. hirsuta and N. hispida.

The specific epithet pudica is Latin for "shy" or "modest" and refers to the species' tendency to conceal its pitchers.

== Description ==
The climbing shoots are up to around 20 m long with a glabrous stem that is 4–6 mm in diameter. The internodes are up to 4 cm long and the underground basal shoots are short with reduced, partially or completely achlorophyllous leaves bearing well-developed lower pitchers. These underground shoots have not been observed to branch or develop roots.
