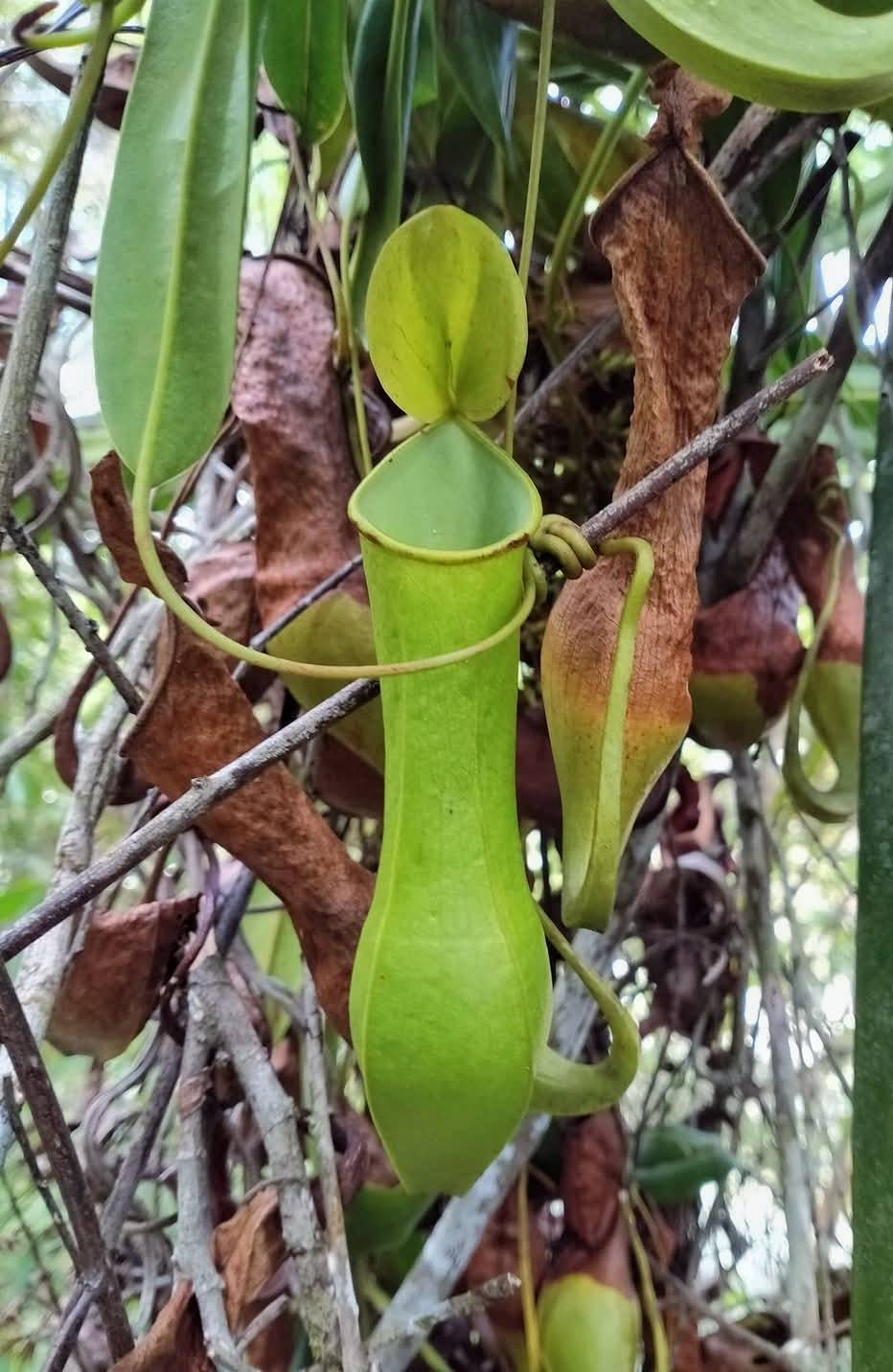

Conservation status
- Critically Endangered (IUCN 3.1)

Scientific classification
- Kingdom: Plantae
- Clade: Tracheophytes
- Clade: Angiosperms
- Clade: Eudicots
- Order: Caryophyllales
- Family: Nepenthaceae
- Genus: Nepenthes
- Species: N. higaonon

Binomial name
- Nepenthes higaonon Lagunday & Amoroso, 2025

= Nepenthes higaonon =

Species of pitcher plant endemic to the Philippines

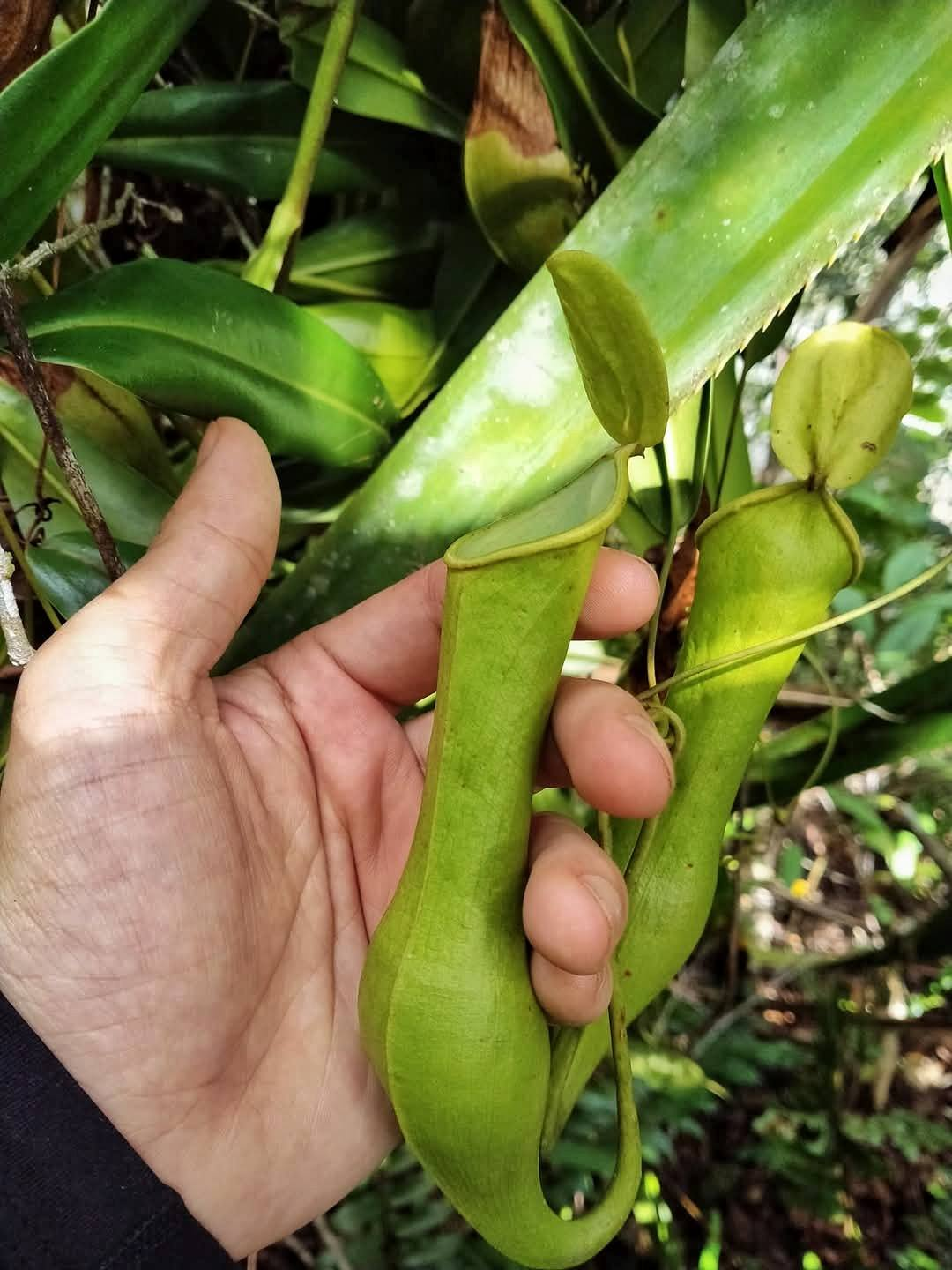

Nepenthes higaonon is a tropical pitcher plant endemic to the gravel substrates of Northern Mindanao, in the Philippines. Particularly, the species was known from Sitio Talangisog, Barangay Eureka, Gingoog City, in Misamis Oriental.

== Description ==
This species was compared to Nepenthes viridis with which it is morphologically most similar. However, Nepenthes higaonon differs from N. viridis in having non-decurrent leaf-to-stem attachment, with the lamina having 3 veins on each side of the midrib, and rounded leaf apex, whereas in the latter the leaf-to-stem attachment is decurrent, with 1-2 veins on each side of the midrib, and with acute leaf apex. The pitchers of N. higaonon is monomorphic, with the aerial pitchers cylindrical in the upper third, and the pitcher lid being flattened, ovate, angled by 90° exposing the pitcher opening as opposed to N. viridis having dimorphic pitchers, aerial pitchers infundibular in the upper third, and its pitcher lid domed, oval to cordate, and angled up to 60° partially covering the pitcher opening. Other notable features of the species is the shallow depression in the anterior peristome of the aerial pitcher (raised in N. viridis), single-flowered inflorescence (vs. 2-flowered), and long climbing stems up to 10 meters (vs. up to 4 meters).

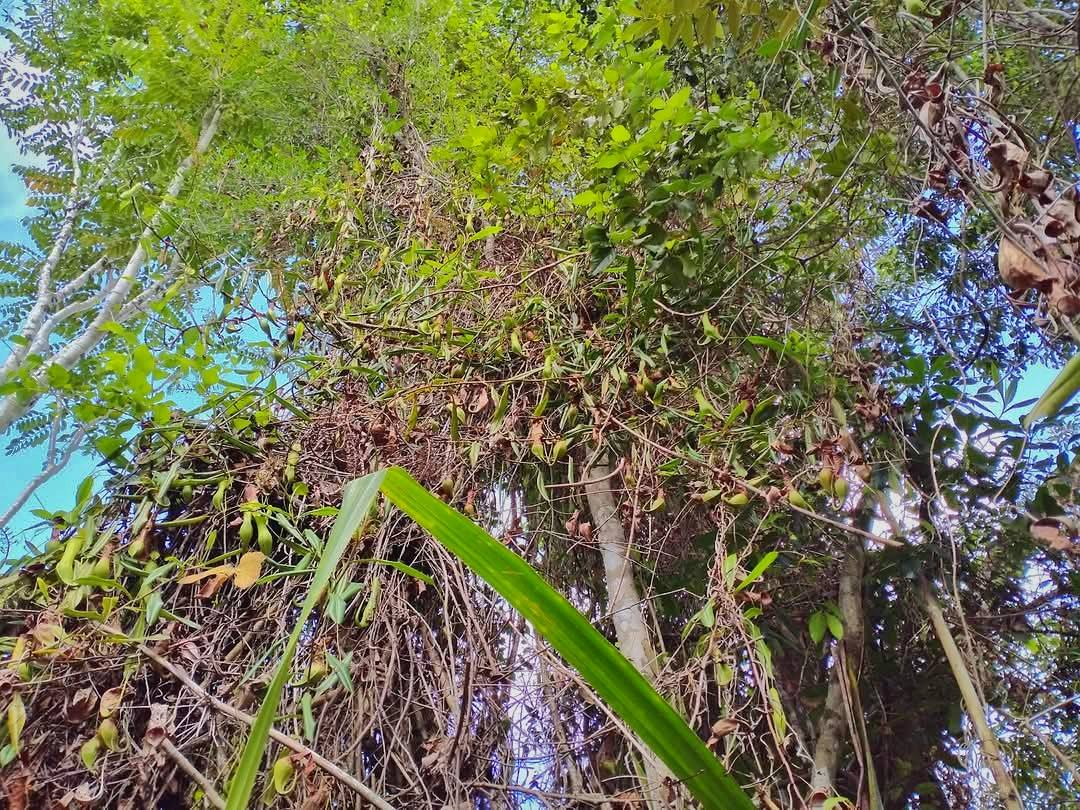

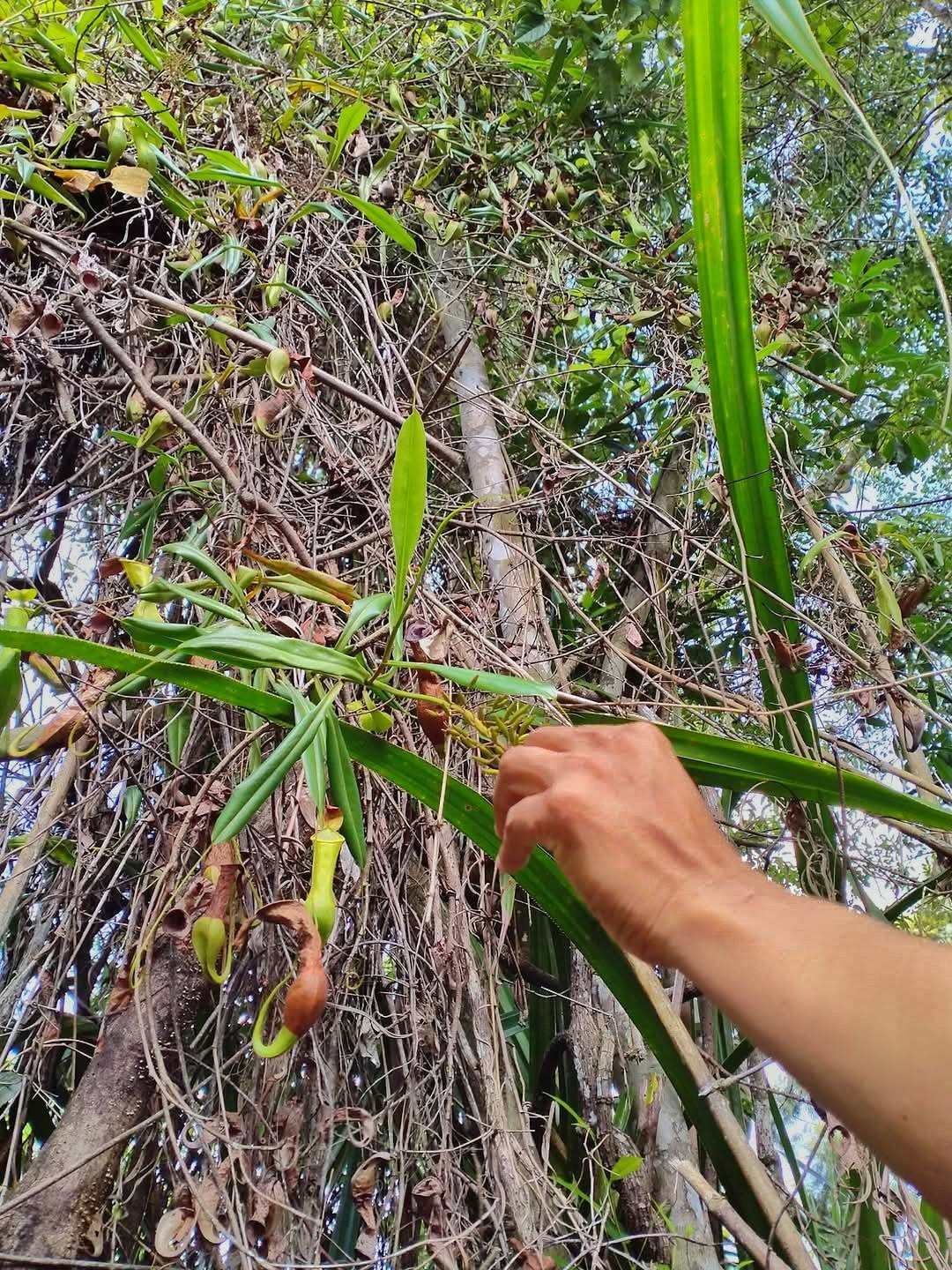

== Etymology ==
The specific epithet is derived from the Higaonon people, the indigenous cultural group in the site.

== Conservation status ==
The species is assessed as Critically Endangered according to IUCN 3.1 Criteria as it faces several threats like poaching, shifting cultivation, and lack of legislative protection.

== Taxonomy ==
Nepenthes higaonon is placed in Nepenthes section Alatae.
