= Nepenthes kampalili =

Conservation status
- Critically Endangered (IUCN 3.1)

Scientific classification
- Kingdom: Plantae
- Clade: Tracheophytes
- Clade: Angiosperms
- Clade: Eudicots
- Order: Caryophyllales
- Family: Nepenthaceae
- Genus: Nepenthes
- Species: N. kampalili

Binomial name
- Nepenthes kampalili Lagunday & V.B. Amoroso, 2024

Species of pitcher plant endemic to the Philippines

Nepenthes kampalili is a tropical pitcher plant endemic to Mt. Kampalili, in Maragusan, province of Davao de Oro, in Mindanao. This species was compared with Nepenthes peltata Sh.Kurata. Nepenthes kampalili differs from N. peltata in its tendril that are apically attached to the leaf, its densely pubescent ground pitchers, pitcher lid that is densely pubescent, and 2 pitcher spur that occasionally arise in the posterior midsection of peristome neck, whereas in N. peltata the tendril-leaf attachment is peltate, the ground pitchers and pitcher lid are glabrous, and the presence of one unbranched pitcher spur.

== Etymology ==
The specific epithet is derived from Mt. Kampalili, the name of the area where the species was found.

== Conservation status ==
The species is assessed as Critically Endangered since its extent of occurrence is estimated to be less than 10 km^{2}, and the population has an estimated 200 mature individuals only.

== Taxonomy ==
Nepenthes kampalili is placed in Nepenthes section Villosa. Among the characters that places it in the section is its petiolate leaves, the well-developed pitcher lid, the blade-like teeth on the peristomes, the lack of central basal appendages in the pitcher lid, and its preference for high altitude ultramafic habitats.
