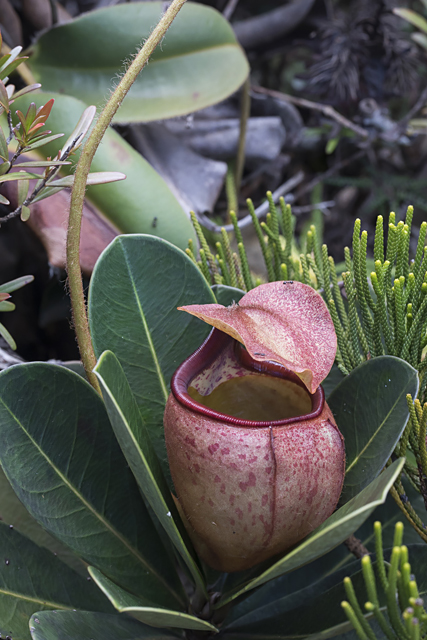
- An upper pitcher of Nepenthes erucoides, photographed at the type locality in the Philippines

Scientific classification
- Kingdom: Plantae
- Clade: Tracheophytes
- Clade: Angiosperms
- Clade: Eudicots
- Order: Caryophyllales
- Family: Nepenthaceae
- Genus: Nepenthes
- Species: N. erucoides

Binomial name
- Nepenthes erucoides A.S. Rob. & S.G. Zamudio, 2019

= Nepenthes erucoides =

Species of carnivorous plant

Nepenthes erucoides is an ultramaficolous tropical pitcher plant endemic to Mount Redondo, the highest peak on the Philippine island of Dinagat, where it occurs from c. 800 meters up until the summit at 929 meters. It grows on a very thin substrate consisting of "lateritic nickel ore and decomposed chromite rubble, through to a clay derived thereof", which has been described as the most extreme ultramafic substrate known to host Nepenthes. Its taxonomic affinities are unclear, though it has been noted for its (apparently superficial) similarities to N. mantalingajanensis from Palawan. The species' ultramaficolous ecological setting has permitted the radiation of a peculiar set of associated traits, those being: "reduced leaf morphologies, sclerophyllous characteristics, hirsuteness and small stature", which have been associated similarly with the diminutive Nepenthes argentii of the windswept, ultramafic peak of Mount Guiting-Guiting, Sibuyan. The authors suggest that morphological analogues in the aforementioned species do not entail genetic association, and as such these may be considered as instances of morphological convergence- derived from associated conditions in ultramaficolous ecology- until further genetic analysis occurs. Nepenthes erucoides co-localizes with N. mindanaoensis (with which it hybridizes) and N. bellii (in zones of dense, protective vegetation). Nepenthes truncata occurs within the extent of the elfin forest below the 800 meter elevation band, N. merrilliana occurring regionally at elevations below 600 meters.

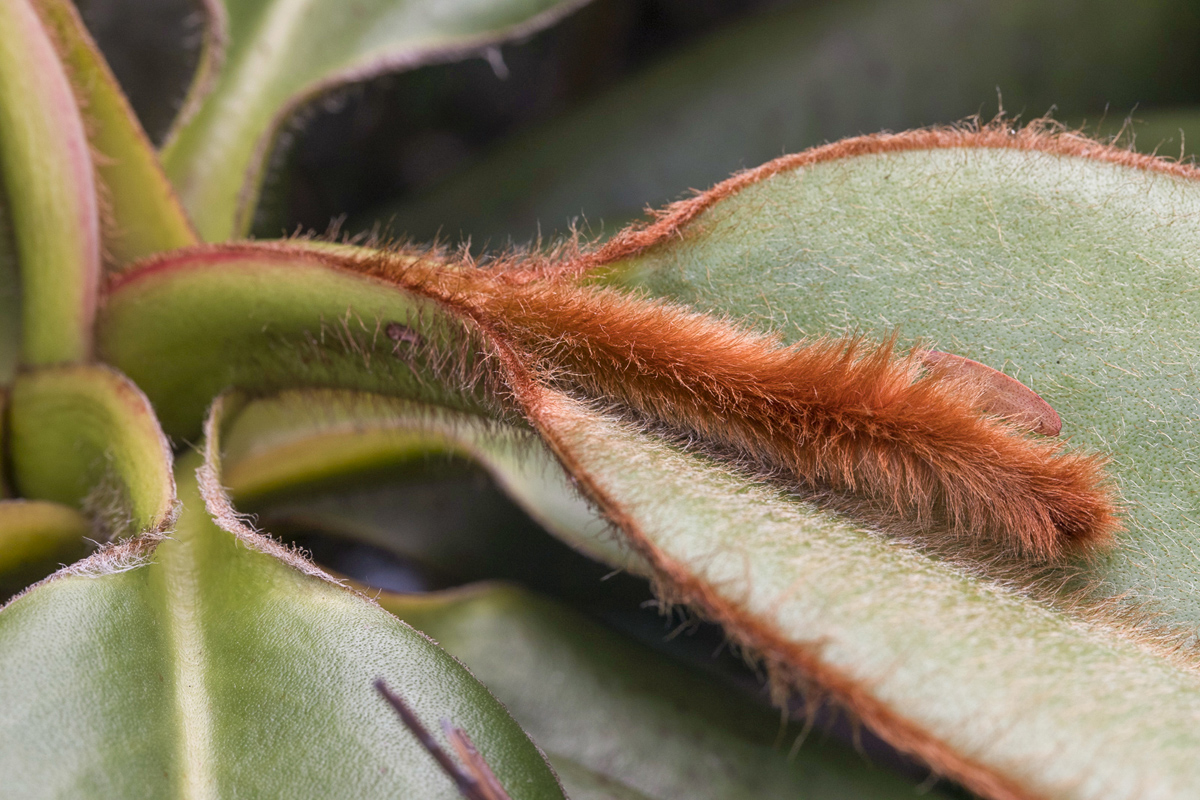
The caterpillar-like emerging growths of this Nepenthes account for the species name erucoides

== Etymology ==
The specific epithet erucoides, formed from the Latin eruca (caterpillar) and Greek -oides (resembling), refers to the densely hairy developing leaves, but particularly the tendrils, which are said to resemble the "exuberantly hairy caterpillars of certain erebid macromoths from the subfamily Arctiinae, such as those of the genus Arctia". The description describes this species as having perhaps the densest indumentum of any Nepenthes in its emerging foliage, but notes that this hair is rapidly dropped as the leaves develop.

== Extinction Status ==
Nepenthes erucoides has been informally assessed by the authors as Critically Endangered under IUCN Red List (2012) criteria B1ab (ii, iii) + 2ab (i, ii, iii), as the species occurs within a reduced area and is threatened by declining habitat integrity.
