= Nepenthes malimumuensis =

Scientific classification
- Kingdom: Plantae
- Clade: Tracheophytes
- Clade: Angiosperms
- Clade: Eudicots
- Order: Caryophyllales
- Family: Nepenthaceae
- Genus: Nepenthes
- Species: N. malimumuensis

Binomial name
- Nepenthes malimumuensis Lagunday, Acma, Cabana, Sabas & V.B.Amoroso, 2019

Tropical pitcher plant endemic to the Philippines

Nepenthes malimumuensis is a tropical pitcher plant endemic to Pantaron Range on the island of Mindanao in the Philippines, where it grows at elevations of 1,000–1,020 m above sea level.

The species was compared to N. sumagaya. Nepenthes malimumuensis can be distinguished from N. sumagaya by its upper pitcher wings, that are reduced to ribs or not apparent, having four-five nerves on either side of the midrib, and the lid appendage is reduced to a keel, whereas the latter's upper pitcher wings are occasionally present in some pitchers close to peristome, having 1-2 nerves on either side of the midrib, and lid appendage are occasionally present.

== Etymology ==
The specific epithet malimumuensis denotes that the species was discovered from Mt. Malimumu.
