= Nepenthes undulatifolia =

Scientific classification
- Kingdom: Plantae
- Clade: Tracheophytes
- Clade: Angiosperms
- Clade: Eudicots
- Order: Caryophyllales
- Family: Nepenthaceae
- Genus: Nepenthes
- Species: N. undulatifolia

Binomial name
- Nepenthes undulatifolia Nerz, Wistuba, U.Zimm., Chi.C.Lee, Pirade & Pitopang (2011)

Species of pitcher plant from Indonesia

Nepenthes undulatifolia is a tropical pitcher plant known only from South East Sulawesi, where it grows at an elevation of around 1,800 m above sea level. The specific epithet undulatifolia refers to the wavy laminar margins of this species.
