= Nepenthes calcicola =

Scientific classification
- Kingdom: Plantae
- Clade: Tracheophytes
- Clade: Angiosperms
- Clade: Eudicots
- Order: Caryophyllales
- Family: Nepenthaceae
- Genus: Nepenthes
- Species: N. calcicola

Binomial name
- Nepenthes calcicola Gary W.Wilson, S.Venter & Damas, 2023

Species of pitcher plant endemic to Papua New Guinea

Nepenthes calcicola is a tropical pitcher plant endemic to the northern Gulf Province in Papua New Guinea. Nepenthes calcicola was compared to Nepenthes neoguineensis.

== Description ==
The species is characterized from N. neoguineensis by its stem that grows beneath the leaf litter, with rosettes of leaves producing erect pitchers which are sometimes half-buried in the litter, a much shorter stem, terete and recurved spur, the peduncle of the female inflorescence 160–190 mm by 3–4 mm, and the obovate to broadly obovate shape of the tepals. On the contrary, N. neoguineensis has stem that grow above the leaf litter, absence of rosettes of pitchers, dorsiventrally flattened and non-recurved spur, a much shorter peduncle of female inflorescence measuring only 120–150 mm by 2–2.5 mm and orbicular-elliptic shape of tepals. The species grows on closed forest over limestone karsts and is assessed as Vulnerable based on IUCN criteria.

== Distribution ==
Nepenthes calcicola is found only at its type locality from the limestone karsts on the tributary of Purari River, the Mua River, located in the Gulf Province of Papua New Guinea.

== Habitat and ecology ==
The species grows on the margins of limestone karsts at an elevation of 250–270 meters in Closed Low Lowland Hill forests. Among the plants that grows within the habitat of Nepenthes calcicola are the emergent species of Pometia pinnata and Syzygium spp. The genera of dominant trees that were documented include Aglaia, Ficus, Myristica, Syzygium, and Terminalia. No other species of Nepenthes were found growing in sympatry with N. calcicola. The substrate in which the species grows are humus-rich clay loam soil with considerable variation in depth. The layer of leaf litter is well developed as well and is up to 20 cm deep.

=== Infauna ===
The examination of the contents of terrestrial and intermediate pitchers showed several trapped invertebrate fauna which include species of ants, cockroaches, snails and slugs, and katydids.

== Etymology ==
The specific epithet refers to the calcareous habitat in which the species grows.

== Conservation status ==
The species is known only from 2 populations that are 1 km apart with less than 1000 individuals. It is assessed as Vulnerable based on IUCN criteria.
