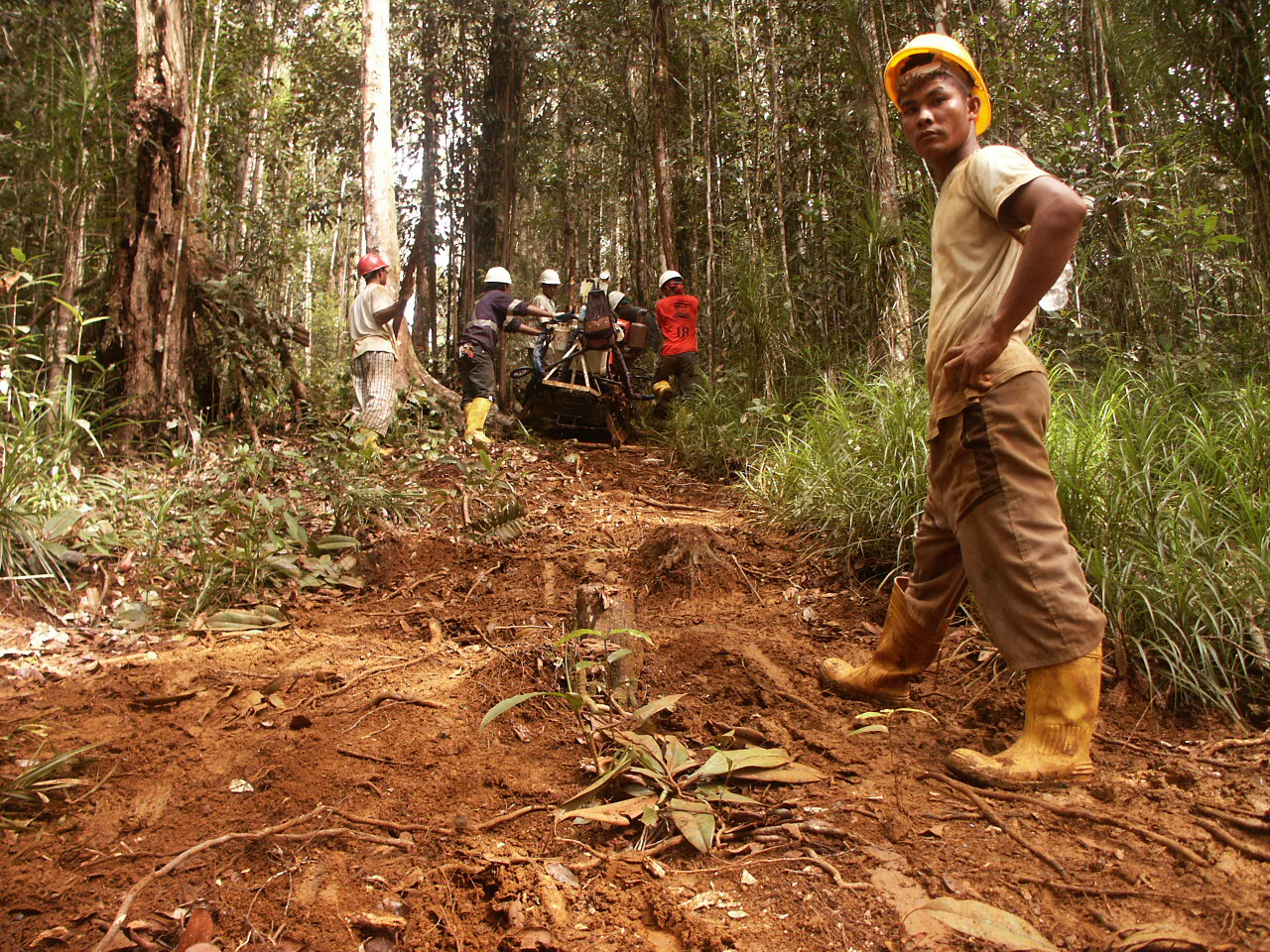
- A rig crew on Halmahera island, moving a drill rig through the forest. The plant in the centre foreground appears to be N. weda.

Scientific classification
- Kingdom: Plantae
- Clade: Embryophytes
- Clade: Tracheophytes
- Clade: Angiosperms
- Clade: Eudicots
- Order: Caryophyllales
- Family: Nepenthaceae
- Genus: Nepenthes
- Species: N. weda

Binomial name
- Nepenthes weda Cheek (2015)

= Nepenthes weda =

Species of pitcher plant from Indonesia

Nepenthes weda is a tropical pitcher plant native to the island of Halmahera, North Maluku, Indonesia. It is currently known only from Bukit Limber, Weda Bay (near the centre of the island), where it grows in lower montane forest on ultramafic substrates at 415–1,014 m above sea level.
