= Nepenthes pongoides =

Scientific classification
- Kingdom: Plantae
- Clade: Tracheophytes
- Clade: Angiosperms
- Clade: Eudicots
- Order: Caryophyllales
- Family: Nepenthaceae
- Genus: Nepenthes
- Species: N. pongoides

Binomial name
- Nepenthes pongoides Damit, Yusof, Jumian, A.S.Rob., 2024

Species of pitcher plant endemic to Sabah, Malaysia

Nepenthes pongoides is a tropical pitcher plant endemic to the Meliau Range, in central Sabah, Malaysia. The species is notable for its large size, making it one of the largest species of Nepenthes described in recent years. Additionally, the species is characterized by peltate tendril exertion and absence of upper pitchers. Among the most exceptional characteristics of this species is having an extraordinarily well-developed, persistent indumentum of long, coarse, dark reddish trichomes, unmatched by any other known Bornean Nepenthes species. The species is assessed as Critically Endangered following the IUCN Red List criteria.

== Etymology ==
The name for this species, pongoides, was derived from word Pongo, a genus of primates, otherwise known as the orangutans and the Greek suffix '-oides' which means "resembling", pertaining to the highly developed and persistent red indumentum of the stems, phyllodes, tendrils, and pitchers.

== Phenology ==
No evidence or flowering individuals were seen.

== Distribution ==
The species is endemic to Meliau Range, having been recorded at elevations of about 900 meters or more.
