= Nepenthes maagnawensis =

Conservation status
- Endangered (IUCN 3.1)

Scientific classification
- Kingdom: Plantae
- Clade: Tracheophytes
- Clade: Angiosperms
- Clade: Eudicots
- Order: Caryophyllales
- Family: Nepenthaceae
- Genus: Nepenthes
- Species: N. maagnawensis

Binomial name
- Nepenthes maagnawensis Lagunday & Amoroso, 2025

Species of pitcher plant endemic to the Philippines

Nepenthes maagnawensis is a tropical pitcher plant endemic to the shrublands of the Kitanglad Mountain Range, Mindanao, Philippines. Specifically, it is known from Mt. Maagnaw in Lantapan, Bukidnon. Morphologically, N. maagnawensis closely resembles Nepenthes kitanglad. However, it differs by having terete stems, lamina with inconspicuous pinnate venation, aerial pitchers that are broadest in the upper third, and a triangular basal central appendage on the aerial pitcher lid. In contrast, N. kitanglad has angular stems, lamina with distinct venation, aerial pitchers that are broadest in the lower third, and lacks a basal central appendage on the aerial pitcher lid. The species is assessed as Endangered according to the IUCN 3.1 Criteria.

== Taxonomy ==
Nepenthes maagnawensis belongs to the genus Nepenthes and is classified under section Alatae.

== Etymology ==
The specific epithet is derived from the type locality, Mt. Maagnaw, in the Kitanglad Mountain Range.

== Distribution and habitat ==
Nepenthes maagnawensis is known to occur in the tropical upper montane shrublands of Mt. Maagnaw, at 2,300 to 2,700 meters above sea level.

== Conservation status ==
The species is assessed as Endangered due to it probably being site endemic with a low population size, having mature individuals estimated to be fewer than 250.
