= Nepenthes hirtella =

Scientific classification
- Kingdom: Plantae
- Clade: Tracheophytes
- Clade: Angiosperms
- Clade: Eudicots
- Order: Caryophyllales
- Family: Nepenthaceae
- Genus: Nepenthes
- Species: N. hirtella

Binomial name
- Nepenthes hirtella Nuanlaong & Suran., 2022

Tropical pitcher plant endemic to Thailand

Nepenthes hirtella is a tropical pitcher plant endemic to Krabi province in Thailand. Nepenthes hirtella differs from the closely allied Nepenthes kerrii from Tarutao Marine Park, Satun Province in Thailand, by its oblanceolate leaves (obovate in N. kerrii), tendril characters, longer lower pitchers, ovate lid, filiform spur, flowers that are solitary or rarely two-flowered that are borne on partial peduncle, and indumentum that covers all the vegetative parts.
