= Nepenthes masoalensis =

Conservation status
- Endangered (IUCN 2.3)

Scientific classification
- Kingdom: Plantae
- Clade: Tracheophytes
- Clade: Angiosperms
- Clade: Eudicots
- Order: Caryophyllales
- Family: Nepenthaceae
- Genus: Nepenthes
- Species: N. masoalensis

Binomial name
- Nepenthes masoalensis Schmid-Höllinger (1977)

Tropical pitcher plant endemic to Madagasgar

Nepenthes masoalensis /nɪˈpɛnθiːz ˌmæsoʊˈlɛnsɪs/ is one of two tropical pitcher plant species from Madagascar, the other being N. madagascariensis.

Nepenthes masoalensis is known only from eastern Madagascar; it occurs in the Masoala Peninsula and the Mount Ambato region. It has been recorded from Pandanus and Sphagnum swamps, mountain ridgetops, and xerophytic vegetation. Nepenthes masoalensis is a lowland species, growing at 0–400 m altitude.
