= Nepenthes harauensis =

Scientific classification
- Kingdom: Plantae
- Clade: Tracheophytes
- Clade: Angiosperms
- Clade: Eudicots
- Order: Caryophyllales
- Family: Nepenthaceae
- Genus: Nepenthes
- Species: N. harauensis

Binomial name
- Nepenthes harauensis Hernawati, R.Satria & Chi.C.Lee, 2022

Pitcher plant endemic to Sumatra

Nepenthes harauensis is a tropical pitcher plant endemic to the Harau region of West Sumatra. Nepenthes harauensis is closely allied in its morphology to N. bongso and N. singalana, however, it differs by its leaf characters that is thickly coriaceous and petiolate, elliptic-oblong in shape, and distinctive peltate tendril insertion.
