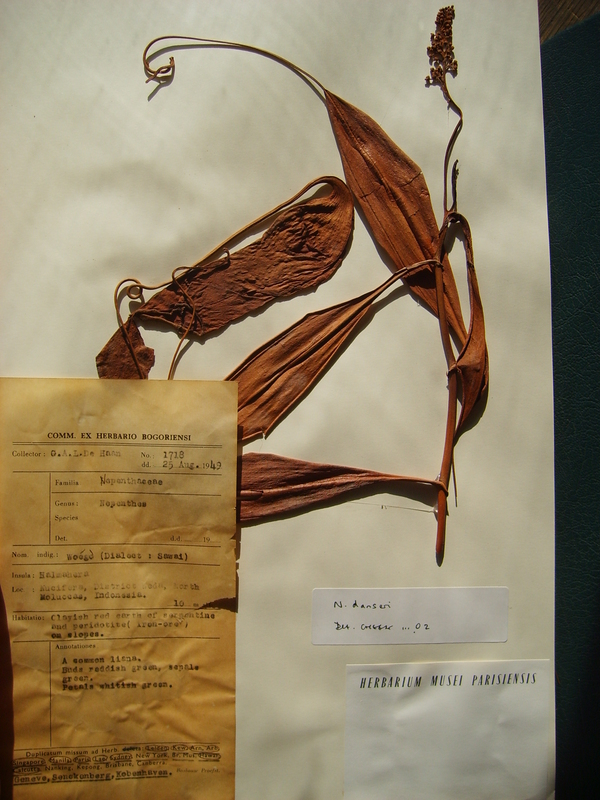
- Isotype of N. halmahera held at the Paris herbarium. It was collected in 1949.

Conservation status
- Least Concern (IUCN 3.1)

Scientific classification
- Kingdom: Plantae
- Clade: Embryophytes
- Clade: Tracheophytes
- Clade: Angiosperms
- Clade: Eudicots
- Order: Caryophyllales
- Family: Nepenthaceae
- Genus: Nepenthes
- Species: N. halmahera

Binomial name
- Nepenthes halmahera Cheek

= Nepenthes halmahera =

Species of pitcher plant from Indonesia

Nepenthes halmahera is a tropical pitcher plant native to the island of Halmahera, North Maluku, Indonesia. In 2015, it was considered confined to the Weda Bay Nickel Project concession area, growing in open areas on ultramafic substrates at altitudes of 10–760 metres (30–2,490 ft). However, the 2018 IUCN assessment found the species to be common in the Weda Bay area. The type specimen used to be regarded as an aberrant representative of N. danseri.
