= Nepenthes sp. Anipahan =

Scientific classification
- Kingdom: Plantae
- Clade: Tracheophytes
- Clade: Angiosperms
- Clade: Eudicots
- Order: Caryophyllales
- Family: Nepenthaceae
- Genus: Nepenthes
- Species: N. sp. Anipahan

Binomial name
- Nepenthes sp. Anipahan

Species of pitcher plant from the Philippines

Nepenthes sp. Anipahan is an undescribed tropical pitcher plant known only from Mount Anipahan in central Palawan, the Philippines, where it grows in upper montane forest at 1,200–1,400 m above sea level. It is very closely allied to N. leonardoi and may be conspecific with it.
