= Nepenthes orbiculata =

Scientific classification
- Kingdom: Plantae
- Clade: Tracheophytes
- Clade: Angiosperms
- Clade: Eudicots
- Order: Caryophyllales
- Family: Nepenthaceae
- Genus: Nepenthes
- Species: N. orbiculata

Binomial name
- Nepenthes orbiculata M.Catal. & Kruetr., 2018

Species of pitcher plant endemic to Thailand

Nepenthes orbiculata is a tropical pitcher plant endemic to Phang Nga Province in Thailand. Among the Nepenthes species associated with N. orbiculata are Nepenthes andamana and Nepenthes mirabilis to which it is sympatric. Particularly, Nepenthes orbiculata is closely related to N. mirabilis but is different in its globose pitchers and its pitcher hip just below the lid, whereas the pitcher in N. mirabilis is more elongate, and the pitcher hip is at the center or in the lower half.. Similarly, Nepenthes orbiculata is closely related to N. mirabilis var. globosa in its glabrous leaves, or leaves with fimbriate margins, and globose pitcher with hip just below the lid. However, N. mirabilis var. globosa is different from N. orbiculata in its climbing habit reaching up to 5 m, and having pitcher that are elongate with lower hips apart from globose ones with hip just below the lid, whereas N. orbiculata is a low shrub about 50 – 150 cm long. Additionally, N. orbiculata is sympatric with N. mirabilis, while N. mirabilis var. globosa is not.

== Etymology ==
The specific epithet is derived from Latin orbiculatus, meaning round.

== Distribution ==
This species is endemic and known only from two populations in Phang Nga Province, in Peninsular Thailand.

== Ecology ==
Nepenthes orbiculata grows in sandy soils, in savannahs and grasslands at sea level.
