= Nepenthes putaiguneung =

Scientific classification
- Kingdom: Plantae
- Clade: Tracheophytes
- Clade: Angiosperms
- Clade: Eudicots
- Order: Caryophyllales
- Family: Nepenthaceae
- Genus: Nepenthes
- Species: N. putaiguneung

Binomial name
- Nepenthes putaiguneung Metusala, Farishy, & Jebb

Tropical pitcher plant endemic to Sumatra in Indonesia

Nepenthes putaiguneung is a tropical pitcher plant endemic to highlands of the island of Sumatra in Indonesia. Nepenthes putaiguneung closely resembles in its morphology to N. singalana, however, it differs from the latter with its narrowly spatulate leaves, the upper pitchers with finely lobed peristome that lacks teeth on inner edge, basal crest of the pitcher lid that has a short, tooth-like appendage, the lower pitcher's lid glands that is confined to the midline, and the minutely short bracteole on the pedicel of male flowers. This species also resembles N. mikei but differs by the shape of the leaves, the shape of the lower pitchers, the short, dense ribs on the peristome of the lower pitcher, the prominent glandular crest on the base of the lid of both pitchers, the clustered glands on the midrib of the lid of the lower pitcher, and the minutely short bracteole on the pedicel of male flowers.
