= Nepenthes candalaga =

Scientific classification
- Kingdom: Plantae
- Clade: Tracheophytes
- Clade: Angiosperms
- Clade: Eudicots
- Order: Caryophyllales
- Family: Nepenthaceae
- Genus: Nepenthes
- Species: N. candalaga

Binomial name
- Nepenthes candalaga Lagunday & V. B. Amoroso, 2022
- Distribution map of Nepenthes candalaga in the Philippines (Mindanao)

Tropical pitcher plant endemic to the Philippines

Nepenthes candalaga is a tropical pitcher plant endemic to Mt. Candalaga, in the Municipality of Maragusan, Davao de Oro, island of Mindanao, Philippines. This bringing the total number of Nepenthes species in this island to 38, making Mindanao the island with the highest concentration of Nepenthes species in the Philippines.

== Description ==
Nepenthes candalaga is closely allied to N. justinae but differs in having a lamina with 2 – 3 longitudinal veins that are parallel with the midrib (3 longitudinal veins in N. justinae). Additionally, the orbicular lid of the pitchers, the lid spur tip that is non-bifid, the triangular lid appendage, the short banner-shaped wings below the peristome that covers only a sixth of the trap's anterior eventually becoming ridges towards the trap base, and the absent upper pitcher rim that is widest near the peristome differentiates this species from N. justinae. The species is assessed as Critically endangered due to the threats of deforestation and habitat loss without legislative protection.

== Etymology ==
The specific epithet refers to the type locality of the species, Mt. Candalaga in Maragusan, Davao de Oro, eastern Mindanao, Philippines. The name is treated as a noun in apposition.

== Distribution and habitat ==
Populations of Nepenthes candalaga were observed only in the tropical upper montane rainforest of Mt. Candalaga in Maragusan, Davao de Oro, eastern Mindanao, Philippines at around 1800 – 2100 meters above sea level. The species was seen scrambling on neighboring plants for support, on tree branches up to 10 m high and on Oleandra sp. and is likely to be endemic to the mountain.
