= Nepenthes fractiflexa =

Scientific classification
- Kingdom: Plantae
- Clade: Tracheophytes
- Clade: Angiosperms
- Clade: Eudicots
- Order: Caryophyllales
- Family: Nepenthaceae
- Genus: Nepenthes
- Species: N. fractiflexa

Binomial name
- Nepenthes fractiflexa Golos, A.S.Rob. & Barer

Species of pitcher plant from Borneo

Nepenthes fractiflexa is a tropical pitcher plant endemic to Borneo, where it has been recorded from a small number of localities across Sarawak and Kalimantan. It grows both terrestrially and epiphytically in ridge forest at elevations of 1,400–2,150 m above sea level. Nepenthes fractiflexa is considerably more diminutive than its putative closest relative, N. mollis. It also differs in its unusual growth habit and plant architecture, producing secondary stems with a frequency rarely seen in the genus, and having activated axillary buds that commonly develop into bract-like prophylls up to 5 cm long. Furthermore, the inflorescence appears to emerge from the middle of the internode, rather than from the leaf axil as is the norm in the genus; it is the first Nepenthes species for which concaulescence (a form of metatopy) has been proposed.

The specific epithet fractiflexa, formed from the Latin fractus (broken) and flexus (bend), refers to the "characteristic distichous vining stems of this species, which bend alternately at the nodes in a zig-zag fashion".

Nepenthes fractiflexa has been informally assessed as Near Threatened according to the IUCN Red List criteria.
