= Nepenthes krabiensis =

Scientific classification
- Kingdom: Plantae
- Clade: Tracheophytes
- Clade: Angiosperms
- Clade: Eudicots
- Order: Caryophyllales
- Family: Nepenthaceae
- Genus: Nepenthes
- Species: N. krabiensis

Binomial name
- Nepenthes krabiensis Nuanlaong, Onsanit, Chusangrach & Suraninpong (2016)

Species of pitcher plant from Southeast Asia

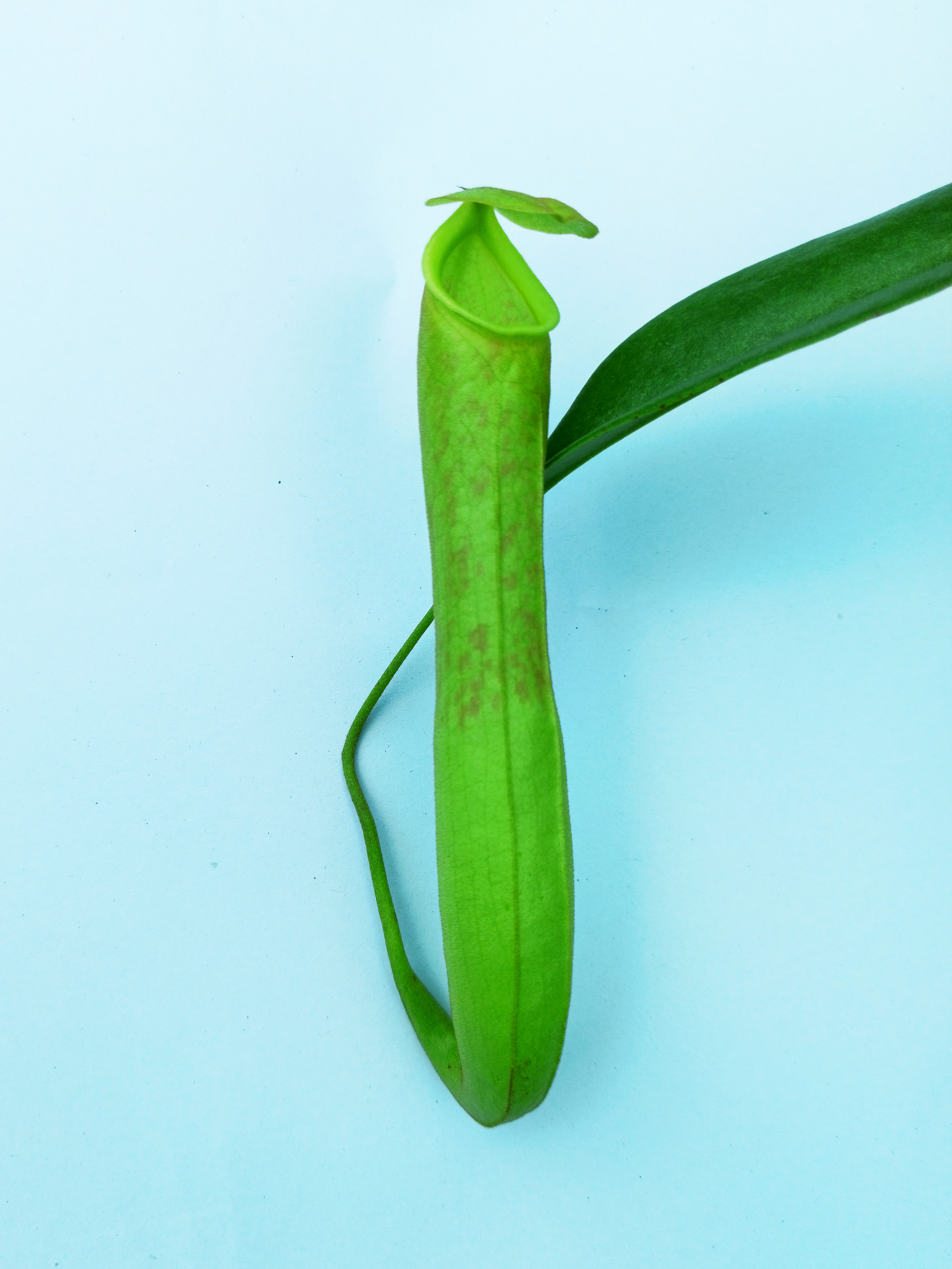
Nepenthes krabiensis

Nepenthes krabiensis is a tropical pitcher plant native to southern Thailand, where it grows at 600–700 m above sea level. It is closely related to N. rosea.

The specific epithet krabiensis is derived from the name of Krabi Province, to which it is apparently endemic, and the Latin ending -ensis, meaning "from".
