= Nepenthes maximoides =

Scientific classification
- Kingdom: Plantae
- Clade: Embryophytes
- Clade: Tracheophytes
- Clade: Spermatophytes
- Clade: Angiosperms
- Clade: Eudicots
- Order: Caryophyllales
- Family: Nepenthaceae
- Genus: Nepenthes
- Species: N. maximoides

Binomial name
- Nepenthes maximoides King and Cheek

Tropical pitcher plant endemic to the Philippines

Nepenthes maximoides is a tropical pitcher plant endemic to Luzon, Philippines bringing the total number of Nepenthes species in this island to eight, and is the only endemic species. Nepenthes maximoides closely resembled N. maxima in its large, spectacular and narrowly funnel-shaped upper pitchers, and the lids have a recurved basal and filiform appendages not seen in any other Philippine species.
