= Nepenthes cabanae =

Scientific classification
- Kingdom: Plantae
- Clade: Tracheophytes
- Clade: Angiosperms
- Clade: Eudicots
- Order: Caryophyllales
- Family: Nepenthaceae
- Genus: Nepenthes
- Species: N. cabanae

Binomial name
- Nepenthes cabanae Lagunday, Noel E. and Victor B. Amoroso

Species of pitcher plant from the Philippines

Nepenthes cabanae is a tropical pitcher plant endemic to Mt. Malimumu, Pantaron Range, Central Mindanao, Philippines, bringing the total number of Nepenthes species in this mountain range to eight.

== Description ==
Nepenthes cabanae was assessed as closest to N. surigaoensis. However, N. cabanae has sessile leaf attachment clasping up to half of the stem running down the internode unevenly, with four longitudinal nerves running parallel with the midvein, subcylindrical lower and intermediate pitchers, and short triangular peristome margin teeth approximately 0.3-0.5 mm in length but not projecting beyond margin; compared with N. surigaoensis with strongly decurrent leaf attachment, 3-4 longitudinal nerves in parallel with midvein, wholly cylindrical or ellipsoidal lower and intermediate pitchers, and distinct peristome margin teeth projecting beyond the margin.

== Etymology and conservation ==
The specific epithet cabanae, is derived in honor of Dr. Veneracion G. Cabana, who funded expeditions in Central Mindanao's unexplored areas, including Mt. Pantaron and Mt. Tangkulan ranges.

Nepenthes cabanae is assessed as Critically Endangered according to the IUCN Red List criteria due to less than 10 km^{2} of extent of occurrence, and wherein the species is likely to suffer habitat loss from number of factors as quarrying, illegal logging, agriculture, and slash-and-burn farming.
