= Nepenthes manobo =

Scientific classification
- Kingdom: Plantae
- Clade: Tracheophytes
- Clade: Angiosperms
- Clade: Eudicots
- Order: Caryophyllales
- Family: Nepenthaceae
- Genus: Nepenthes
- Species: N. manobo

Binomial name
- Nepenthes manobo Lagunday, Acma, Cabana, Sabas & V.B.Amoroso, 2017

Tropical pitcher plant endemic to the Philippines

Nepenthes manobo is a tropical pitcher plant endemic in the Philippines discovered in the Pantaron Range on the island of Mindanao, where it grows at a narrow elevation range of 1,000–1,020 m above sea level.

The species was compared to N. surigaoensis. Nepenthes manobo can be distinguished from N. surigaoensis due to it having sessile leaves clasping 1/2 of the stem diameter with three nerves on either side of the stem diameter, the bottom half of its lower pitchers are bulbous and ovate in shape but cylindrical towards the opening, its upper pitchers had a distinctive hip with an orbicular to ovate lid shape, and the inner margin of the peristome had short teeth-like projections, whereas N. surigaoensis has a strongly decurrent petiole with three to four nerves, wholly cylindrical or ellipsoidal lower pitchers, and apparent hip on its upper pitchers, ovate to elliptic lid shape, and long teeth-like projections on peristome's inner margin.

== Etymology ==
The specific epithet manobo was chosen to acknowledge the indigenous Manobo tribe where the species is said to occur in their ancestral territory in the Pantaron range.
