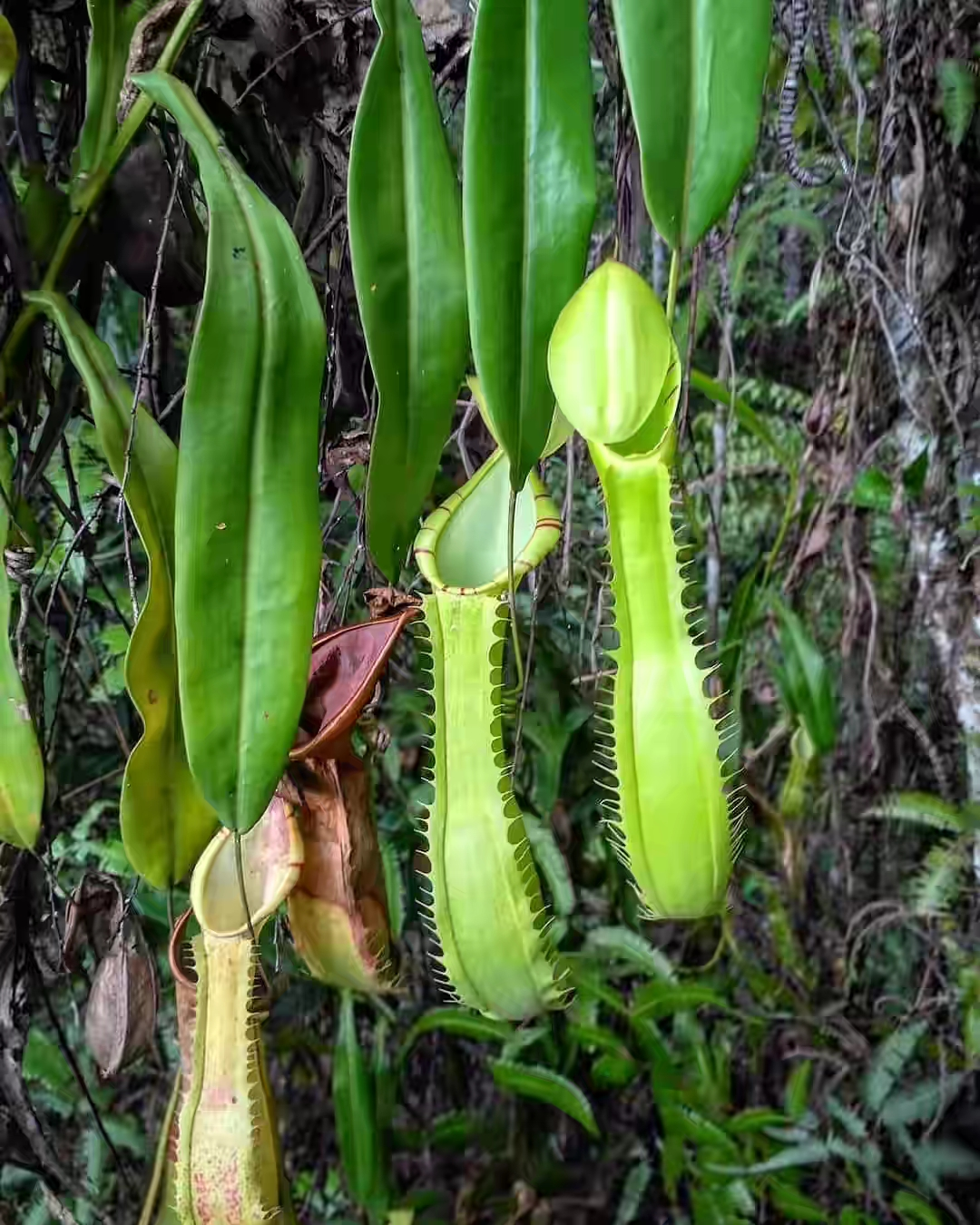
- An upper pitcher of N. longiptera in type locality.

Scientific classification
- Kingdom: Plantae
- Clade: Tracheophytes
- Clade: Angiosperms
- Clade: Eudicots
- Order: Caryophyllales
- Family: Nepenthaceae
- Genus: Nepenthes
- Species: N. longiptera

Binomial name
- Nepenthes longiptera Victoriano, 2021

= Nepenthes longiptera =

Tropical pitcher plant endemic to Sumatra in Indonesia

Nepenthes longiptera is a tropical pitcher plant endemic to the province of Aceh in the island of Sumatra in Indonesia. Nepenthes longiptera differs from all other Nepenthes species from Sumatra by the presence of wings on its upper pitchers. Morphologically, this species closely resembled N. tobaica, but differs on its much larger habit, the well-developed wings of its upper pitchers, the rhomboid-shaped cross-section of the stem, and the presence of appendage under the lid.

The presence of putative hybrid with sympatric species was also recorded.
