= Nepenthes tboli =

Conservation status
- Critically Endangered (IUCN 3.1)

Scientific classification
- Kingdom: Plantae
- Clade: Tracheophytes
- Clade: Angiosperms
- Clade: Eudicots
- Order: Caryophyllales
- Family: Nepenthaceae
- Genus: Nepenthes
- Species: N. tboli

Binomial name
- Nepenthes tboli Jebb & Cheek

Species of pitcher plant from the Philippines

Nepenthes tboli is a tropical pitcher plant native to the Philippines. The type specimen was collected in 1993 around Lake Parker, T'Boli, South Cotabato, Mindanao, at 1,463 m (4,800 ft) above sea level.

== Conservation ==
Nepenthes tboli is considered rare and is only known from a few specimens where it was initially collected. The species is in danger of extinction due to habitat loss as a result of human expansion.
