= Nepenthes ulukaliana =

Scientific classification
- Kingdom: Plantae
- Clade: Tracheophytes
- Clade: Angiosperms
- Clade: Eudicots
- Order: Caryophyllales
- Family: Nepenthaceae
- Genus: Nepenthes
- Species: N. ulukaliana

Binomial name
- Nepenthes ulukaliana A.S.Rob., Wistuba, Mey, Golos, G.Lim & S.McPherson, 2023

Species of pitcher plant endemic to Peninsular Malaysia

Nepenthes ulukaliana is a tropical pitcher plant endemic to the southern Titiwangsa Range in Peninsular Malaysia. Nepenthes ulukaliana was compared to Nepenthes macfarlanei however, it exhibits several distinctions which include pitchers adorned with a dense covering of filamentous lid hairs measuring less than 1 mm long (in contrast to pitchers with numerous lid hairs that are thickened and range from 5 to 12 mm long in N. macfarlanei). Also, the lower pitchers of N. ulukaliana have an amphora-shaped to urceolate form (as opposed to being ovoid in shape in N. macfarlanei in the basal portion of the pitcher with a faint hip and then turning cylindrical above the hip). Furthermore, the peristome of N. ulukaliana is planar at the front, with a well-defined column that emerges abruptly and perpendicularly at the rear (while the peristome of N. macfarlanei is curved in lateral aspect, with the column arising gradually).

== Etymology ==
The name for this species was derived from the name of the mountain, Gunung Ulu Kali, the type locality of the taxon.

== Phenology ==
The species was observed to flower throughout the year, with female plants in the peak of anthesis around January.

== Distribution and Ecology ==
Individuals of N. ulukaliana were recorded at 8 peaks of the southern Titiwangsa Range with an elevation range of above 1,200 meters above sea level and reaching an upper limit of 1,772 meters above sea level on the peak of Gunung Ulu Kali, the species highest known elevation.

This particular species can be found growing terrestrially and epiphytically within mossy forests. It is also commonly encountered in areas with known disturbances such as roadsides.
