= Nepenthes zygon =

Scientific classification
- Kingdom: Plantae
- Clade: Embryophytes
- Clade: Tracheophytes
- Clade: Spermatophytes
- Clade: Angiosperms
- Clade: Eudicots
- Order: Caryophyllales
- Family: Nepenthaceae
- Genus: Nepenthes
- Species: N. zygon

Binomial name
- Nepenthes zygon Jebb & Cheek (2014)

Species of pitcher plant from the Philippines

Nepenthes zygon is a tropical pitcher plant native to the Philippines. The type specimen originates from a plant cultivated at the Royal Botanic Gardens, Kew, grown from seed collected in 1997 by Robert Cantley on Mount Pasian, Mindanao.
