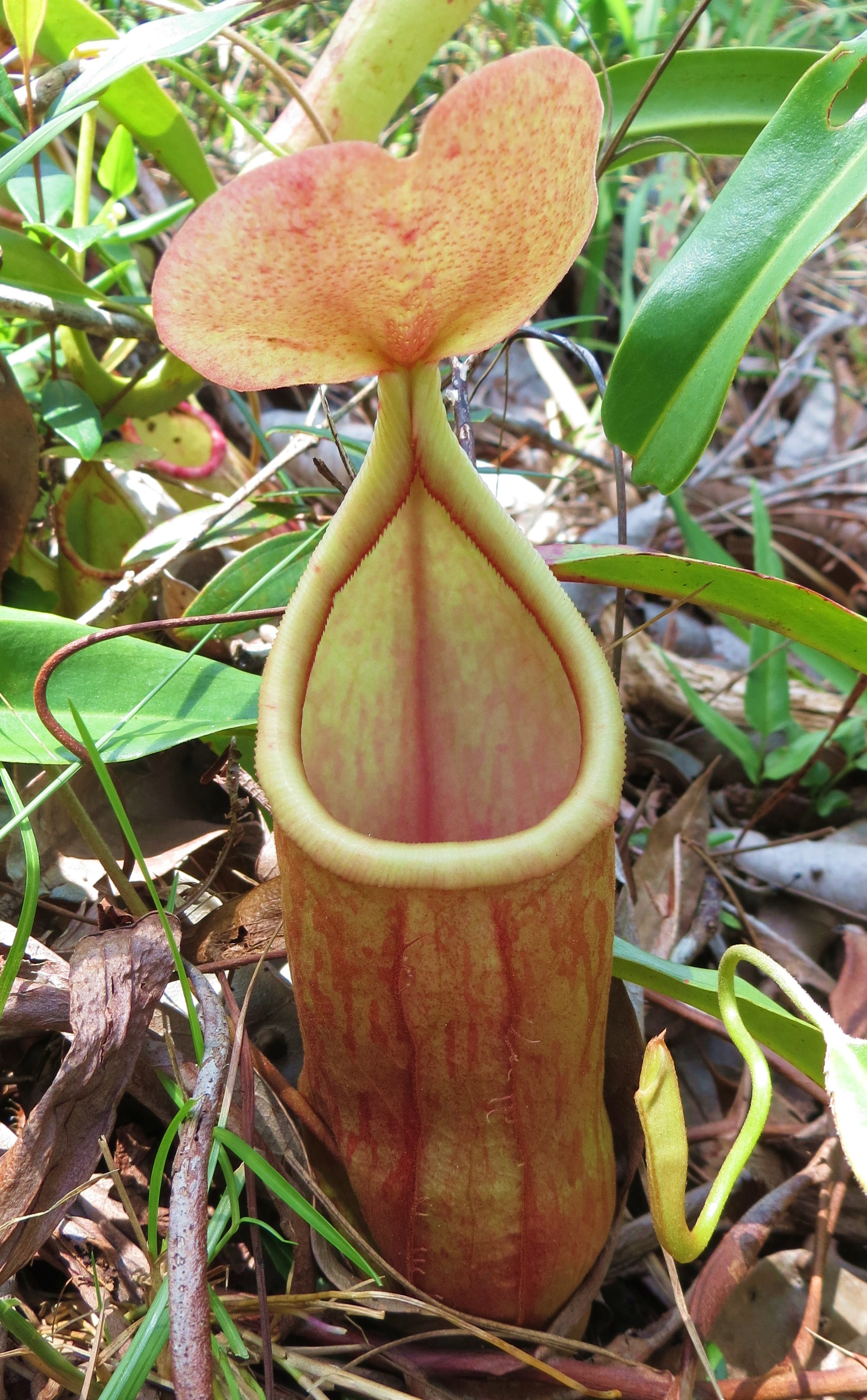
- Nepenthes rosea lower pitcher

Scientific classification
- Kingdom: Plantae
- Clade: Tracheophytes
- Clade: Angiosperms
- Clade: Eudicots
- Order: Caryophyllales
- Family: Nepenthaceae
- Genus: Nepenthes
- Species: N. rosea

Binomial name
- Nepenthes rosea M.Catal. & Kruetr. (2014)

= Nepenthes rosea =

Species of pitcher plant from Thailand

Nepenthes rosea is a tropical pitcher plant known only from Krabi Province, Peninsular Thailand, where it grows at 450–520 m above sea level. Nepenthes rosea got its name from their pitchers which often have uniformly pink interiors. It has been seen growing in sand and humus in varying proportions, on both vertical and flat ground in clearings, scrubland, and open forests. Nepenthes rosea was formally described by Marcello Catalano and Trongtham Kruetreepradit in December 2014. It is unusual in that it sometimes produces a rosette along the peduncle. Nepenthes rosea belongs to the N. thorelii aggregate.
