= Nepenthes sericea =

Scientific classification
- Kingdom: Plantae
- Clade: Tracheophytes
- Clade: Angiosperms
- Clade: Eudicots
- Order: Caryophyllales
- Family: Nepenthaceae
- Genus: Nepenthes
- Species: N. sericea

Binomial name
- Nepenthes sericea Golos, Wistuba, G.Lim, Mey, S.McPherson & A.S.Rob., 2023

Species of pitcher plant endemic to Peninsular Malaysia

Nepenthes sericea is a tropical pitcher plant endemic to the north-central Titiwangsa Range in Peninsular Malaysia and is particularly known from Cameron Highlands. Nepenthes sericea was distinguished from Nepenthes macfarlanei by its pitchers having a dense covering of filamentous lid hairs that are 2 mm long or shorter, whereas the latter has pitchers with numerous thickened lid hairs that are 5–12 mm long. Also, the upper pitchers of N. sericea can either be entirely infundibular or funnel-shaped with a slight narrowing just below the peristome, or some plants may have a mid-point hip in their upper pitcher with the rest of the pitcher turning cylindrical to sub-infundibular in shape above the hip. In contrast, the upper pitchers of N. macfarlanei are generally wholly infundibular and may or may not have a hip present just below the peristome.

== Etymology ==
The name for this species, "sericea", was derived from the Latin word sericus which means "silken", in reference to the notably fine hairs that are softer to the touch in comparison to the coarse bristles of Nepenthes macfarlanei.

== Phenology ==
The species was observed to flower throughout the year.

== Distribution and ecology ==
Individuals of N. sericea were recorded at the several peaks of the Titiwangsa Range with an elevation range of 1,300 meters above sea level and reaching an upper limit of 2,180 meters above sea level on the peak of Gunung Korbu, the highest mountain in the range.

This particular species can be found growing terrestrially or as epiphytic plants within mossy forests, as well as on top of scrub-covered mountain peaks. The lower pitchers of this plant form and often become encased in a dense layer of Sphagnum moss.
