= Nepenthes berbulu =

Scientific classification
- Kingdom: Plantae
- Clade: Tracheophytes
- Clade: Angiosperms
- Clade: Eudicots
- Order: Caryophyllales
- Family: Nepenthaceae
- Genus: Nepenthes
- Species: N. berbulu

Binomial name
- Nepenthes berbulu H.L.Tan, G.Lim, Mey, Golos, Wistuba, S.McPherson & A.S.Rob., 2023

Species of pitcher plant endemic to Peninsular Malaysia

Nepenthes berbulu is a tropical pitcher plant endemic to the Titiwangsa Range, in Peninsular Malaysia.

== Etymology ==
The name for this species, berbulu, was derived from the Malay prefix ber-, which means "having" and bulu, which means "hair", in reference to the fleshy bristles in the lower surface of the pitcher lid.

== Phenology ==
The species was observed flowering in the months of February and August. Male inflorescence were observed along with few developing female inflorescence and seed pods in February 2020. Additionally, both male and female inflorescences, and infructescences were observed in August 2022.

== Distribution and ecology ==
Individuals of N. berbulu were recorded at the five peaks of the Titiwangsa Range with an elevation range of 1,400 to 2,100 meters above sea level. As the only Nepenthes species, it is quite common at its type locality from around 1,900 masl to the summit due in part to the extensive mossy forest in the upper reaches of the mountain. On the other hand, at its lowest recorded elevation of 1,400 masl where the area is more arid than the type locality, N. berbulu grows together with an unidentified Nepenthes taxon, along with several putative natural hybrids.

At the type locality, N. berbulu is associated and found growing terrestrially amongst stunted ericaceous forest in the summit intertwining among bamboos and stunted shrubs. In the mossy forests, it grows terrestrially, or epiphytically on moss-covered trees, or on Spaghnum-moss covered earth banks.
