= New Nepenthes =

New Nepenthes: Volume One
- Cover showing N. appendiculata
- Author: Stewart McPherson
- Language: English
- Publisher: Redfern Natural History Productions
- Publication date: December 2011
- Media type: Print (hardcover)
- Pages: xiv + 595
- ISBN: 978-0-9558918-9-2
- OCLC: 778635047

New Nepenthes: Volume One is a reference work by Stewart McPherson on the pitcher plants of the genus Nepenthes. It was published in 2011 by Redfern Natural History Productions and focuses on discoveries made since the release of McPherson's 2009 monograph, Pitcher Plants of the Old World. The book was edited by Alastair Robinson.

== Content ==
As a supplementary volume to Pitcher Plants of the Old World, the book covers taxa documented since the publication of that work in 2009, including 18 new species, 2 revised species, 1 new variety, and 2 new incompletely diagnosed taxa. The book provides detailed accounts of all of these taxa, often in the format of its predecessor, and these are accompanied by expedition reports and formal species descriptions. The content is arranged in broad geographical categories.

Seven species are formally described as new: N. appendiculata and N. epiphytica from Borneo, N. ceciliae and N. pulchra from the Philippines, N. nigra and N. undulatifolia from Sulawesi, and N. monticola from New Guinea. This last species had previously been confused with the ultrahighland N. lamii; its recognition as a distinct species necessitated the publication of a revised circumscription for N. lamii. The work also includes an emended description of N. thorelii, which was rediscovered in 2011 after more than 100 years. Two "incompletely diagnosed taxa" are also included: N. sp. Anipahan and N. sp. Luzon (later described as N. aenigma).

The book includes accounts of the discovery of all newly described species, as well as new populations of N. attenboroughii, N. holdenii, N. philippinensis and related taxa, N. pitopangii (previously known from a single plant), and an undiagnosed Nepenthes taxon from the Cardamom Mountains of Cambodia.

=== Species ===
The following 23 newly discovered or revised taxa are covered in New Nepenthes. The seven species denoted with an asterisk (*) are formally described in the book; the two with a dagger (†) are given emended descriptions.

1. N. andamana
2. N. appendiculata *
3. N. ceciliae *
4. N. chang
5. N. epiphytica *
6. N. gantungensis
7. N. hamiguitanensis
8. N. holdenii
9. N. kerrii
10. N. lamii †
11. N. leonardoi
12. N. mirabilis var. globosa
13. N. monticola *
14. N. nigra *
15. N. palawanensis
16. N. pulchra *
17. N. robcantleyi
18. N. suratensis
19. N. thai
20. N. thorelii †
21. N. undulatifolia *

Incompletely diagnosed taxa

1. N. sp. Anipahan
2. N. sp. Luzon (N. aenigma)

Additionally, all known highland Palaweño species are covered in detail, including N. attenboroughii, N. deaniana, N. mantalingajanensis, and N. mira.

Overall, 138 species and 3 incompletely diagnosed taxa are recognised in the genus.

== Future volumes ==
With regard to future volumes, McPherson writes:

Although this work addresses all new Nepenthes and novel observations relating to the genus discovered since 2009, it is specifically titled Volume One because continuing exploration is likely to reveal additional Nepenthes species, as well as information that adds to our understanding of the diversity, ecology and taxonomy of these complex and fascinating plants. When sufficient observations have been made, it is my intent to publish further New Nepenthes volumes as required.
