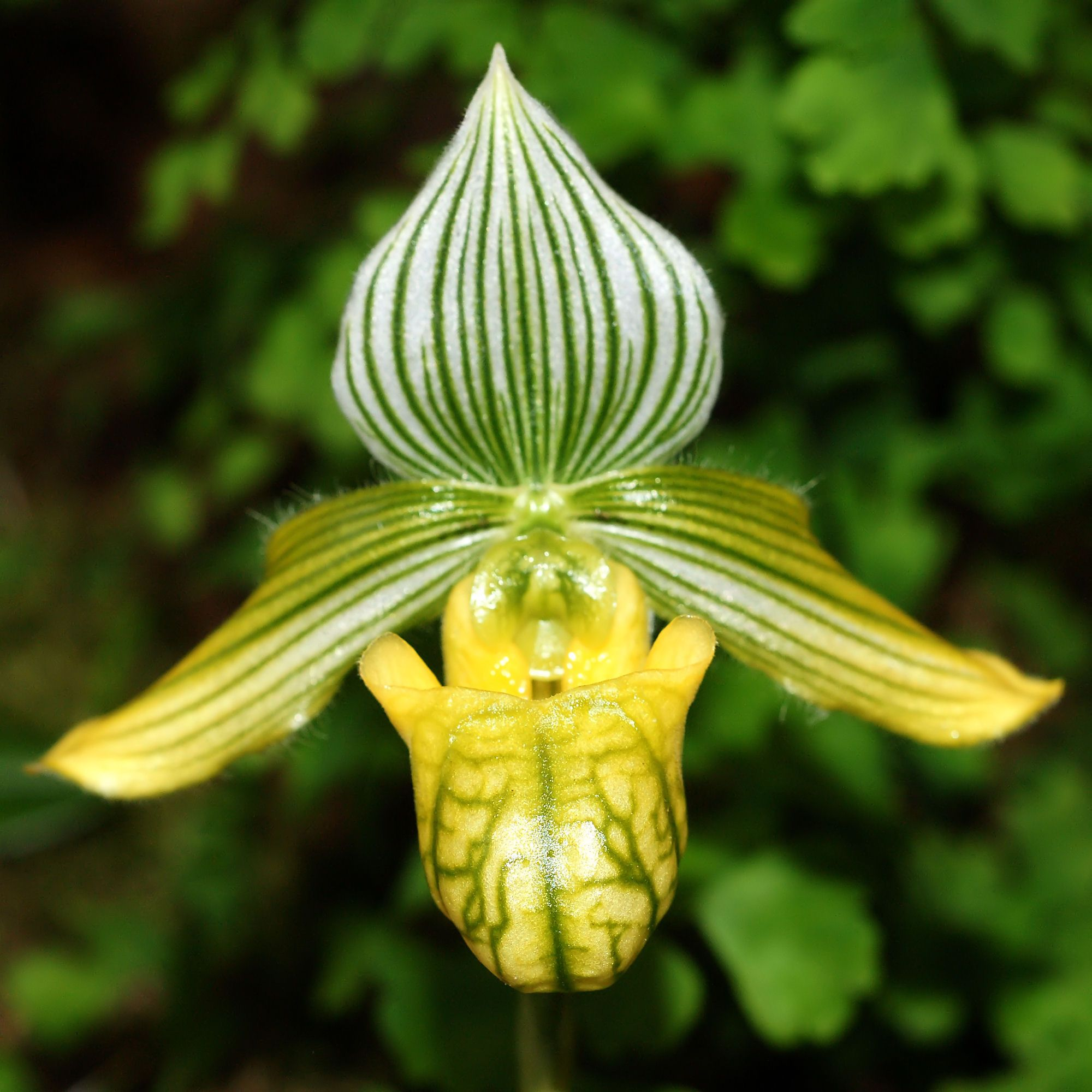
- Paphiopedilum venustum var. alba

Scientific classification
- Kingdom: Plantae
- Clade: Tracheophytes
- Clade: Angiosperms
- Clade: Monocots
- Order: Asparagales
- Family: Orchidaceae
- Subfamily: Cypripedioideae
- Genus: Paphiopedilum
- Subgenus: Paphiopedilum subg. Sigmatopetalum; Karasawa & Saito 1982

Type species
- Paphiopedilum venustum

Species
- See text

= Paphiopedilum subg. Sigmatopetalum =

Subgenus of flowering plants

Paphiopedilum subgenus Sigmatopetalum is a subgenus of the genus Paphiopedilum.

== Distribution ==
Plants from this section are found from India and China, down to Southeast Asia, Papua New Guinea and the Solomon Islands .

== Species ==
Paphiopedilum subgenus Sigmatopetalum comprises the following species:

Image	Name	Distribution	Elevation (m)
	Paphiopedilum acmodontum M.W. Wood 1976	Philippines (Visayan area, and Negros)	1,000–1,500 metres (3,300–4,900 ft)
	Paphiopedilum agusii Cavestro & N. Bougourd 2017	Java	900 metres (3,000 ft)
	Paphiopedilum appletonianum Rolfe 1896	Thailand and Laos	450–600 metres (1,480–1,970 ft)
	Paphiopedilum argus (Rchb. f.) Stein 1892	Philippines (Luzon)	1,200–1,700 metres (3,900–5,600 ft)
	Paphiopedilum barbatum (Lindl.) Pfitzer 1888	Malaysia (Penang, Gunong Beor through Gunong Ophir)	480–1,200 metres (1,570–3,940 ft)
	Paphiopedilum braemii H.Mohr 1989	Sumatra	700 metres (2,300 ft)
	Paphiopedilum bougainvilleanum Fowlie 1971	Solomon Islands (Bougainville)	1,100–1,850 metres (3,610–6,070 ft)
	Paphiopedilum bullenianum [Rchb.f] Pfitzer 1894	Malaysia (Borneo, Sumatra, Sulawesi)	0–1,115 metres (0–3,658 ft)
	Paphiopedilum bungebelangii Metusala 2017	Sumatra	1,575 metres (5,167 ft)
	Paphiopedilum callosum (Rchb. f.) Pfitzer 1895	Cambodia (Loei province), Laos, Vietnam, and Thailand	340–1,000 metres (1,120–3,280 ft)
	Paphiopedilum ciliolare (Rchb. f.) Stein 1892	Philippines (Surigao del Sur, Siargao, and Dinagat Islands)	300–800 metres (980–2,620 ft)
	Paphiopedilum dayanum (Rchb. f.) Pfitzer 1895	Borneo (Sabah)	550–1,000 metres (1,800–3,280 ft)
	Paphiopedilum fowliei Birk 1981	Philippines (Palawan Island)	700–900 metres (2,300–3,000 ft)
	Paphiopedilum hennisianum (M.W. Wood) Fowlie 1977	Philippines (Pany, Negros and Visayan)	640–1,000 metres (2,100–3,280 ft)
	Paphiopedilum hookerae (Rchb. f.) Pfitzer 1895	Malaysia (Sarawak, East Malaysia and in Kalimantan, Borneo)	600–760 metres (1,970–2,490 ft)
	Paphiopedilum javanicum (Reinw. ex Blume) Pfitzer 1888	Indonesia (Java, Bala, and Flores)	910–1,700 metres (2,990–5,580 ft)
	Paphiopedilum lawrenceanum (Rchb. f.) Pfitzer 1888	Borneo (Sabah)	300–400 metres (980–1,310 ft)
	Paphiopedilum lunatum Metusala 2017	Sumatra	1,300–1,600 metres (4,300–5,200 ft)
	Paphiopedilum mastersianum (Rchb. f.) Pfitzer 1895	Indonesia (Ceram and Buru)	910–1,800 metres (2,990–5,910 ft)
	Paphiopedilum nataschae Braem 2015	Sulawesi	
	Paphiopedilum papuanum (Ridl.) L.O.Williams 1946	Indonesia (Irian Jaya) and Papua New Guinea (Arfak Mountains)	790–1,000 metres (2,590–3,280 ft)
	Paphiopedilum parnatanum Cavestro 1999	Philippines (W. Luzon)	700 metres (2,300 ft)
	Paphiopedilum purpuratum [Lindley] Stein 1894	China (Gunagdong, Guangxi, Hainan) and Vietnam	500–1,400 metres (1,600–4,600 ft)
	Paphiopedilum qingyongii Z.J.Liu & L.J.Chen 2010	China (Xizang)	
	Paphiopedilum robinsonianum Cavestro 2014	Indonesia (Sulawesi)	1,400 metres (4,600 ft)
	Paphiopedilum rohmanii Cavestro 2017	Sumatra	700–800 metres (2,300–2,600 ft)
	Paphiopedilum sandyanum Cavestro & G.Benk 2022	Indonesia (Moluccas)	300–400 metres (980–1,310 ft)
	Paphiopedilum sangii Braem 1987	Indonesia (Sulawesi)	1,000–1,200 metres (3,300–3,900 ft)
	Paphiopedilum schoseri Braem & H.Mohr 1988	Indonesia (Moluccas and Bacaa Islands)	1,000–1,300 metres (3,300–4,300 ft)
	Paphiopedilum sugiyamanum Cavestro 2001	Sabah Borneo	800 metres (2,600 ft)
	Paphiopedilum sukhakulii Schoser & Senghas 1965	Thailand (Phu Luang Mountains and Loei)	240–910 metres (790–2,990 ft)
	Paphiopedilum superbiens (Rchb. f.) Pfitzer 1895	Central Sumatra	600–1,200 metres (2,000–3,900 ft)
	Paphiopedilum tonsum (Rchb. f.) Pfitzer 1895	Indonesia (Sumatra)	760–1,600 metres (2,490–5,250 ft)
	Paphiopedilum urbanianum Fowlie 1981	Philippines (Mindoro)	460–760 metres (1,510–2,490 ft)
	Paphiopedilum venustum [Wall. ex Sims] Pfitz. 1888	India (Assam, Darjeeling, and Sikkim)	300–1,500 metres (980–4,920 ft)
	Paphiopedilum violascens	Papua New Guinea (Garaina, Kui, and Kar Kar Islands )	180–1,000 metres (590–3,280 ft)
	Paphiopedilum wardii Summerhayes 1932	Northern Burma and China (Yunnan)	1,200–1,500 metres (3,900–4,900 ft)
	Paphiopedilum wentworthianum Schoser & Fowlie 1968	Solomon Islands (Bougainville and Guadalcanal)	820–1,800 metres (2,690–5,910 ft)
	Paphiopedilum zulhermanianum Cavestro 2017	West Sumatra	700–800 metres (2,300–2,600 ft)
