= Pitcher Plants of the Old World =

2009 book by Stewart McPherson

- Covers showing N. northiana (left) and C. follicularis (right)
- Author: Stewart McPherson
- Language: English
- Publisher: Redfern Natural History Productions
- Publication date: May 2009
- Media type: Print (hardcover)
- Pages: xvi + 1399
- ISBN: 978-0-9558918-2-3 (Volume I); ISBN 978-0-9558918-3-0 (Volume II)
- OCLC: 437275713

Pitcher Plants of the Old World is a two-volume monograph by Stewart McPherson on the pitcher plants of the genera Nepenthes and Cephalotus. It was published in May 2009 by Redfern Natural History Productions and covers all species known at the time. The work was edited by Alastair Robinson and Andreas Fleischmann.

The monograph was followed in 2011 by New Nepenthes: Volume One, a supplementary work covering the many Nepenthes taxa documented in the preceding few years.

== Background ==
In an interview with The Hoopoe, McPherson explained his reasons for writing the book and the extensive field work that it involved:

I prepared Pitcher Plants of the Old World in response to the lack of available information on dozens of species of Nepenthes. Since many species of Nepenthes are not in cultivation, and also because there is often confusion concerning those that are, I resolved to study and photograph each species of Nepenthes and Cephalotus in the wild, in order to document each adequately. After graduating from university in 2006 at the age of 23, I began three years of intense research focusing on Nepenthes and Cephalotus, and spent a cumulative total of eighteen months in the field. Over the last three years, I climbed over one hundred mountains across Southeast Asia in search of species of Nepenthes. Many of these journeys were relatively simple, lasting just a few days or less. Others required more extensive effort, and in a few cases, I spent more than one week to find a single Nepenthes taxon.

== Content ==
The book gives a detailed account of the singular Cephalotus follicularis as well as 120 species of Nepenthes, including one described for the first time (N. micramphora). A further five "incompletely diagnosed taxa" are included: N. sp. Misool, N. sp. Papua (later identified as N. lamii), N. sp. Phanga Nga (later described as N. mirabilis var. globosa), N. sp. Sulawesi (later described as N. nigra), and N. sp. Trang (later described as N. kerrii). Nepenthes hamiguitanensis—which would be described in McPherson's next book, Carnivorous Plants and their Habitats—is treated here as a natural hybrid between N. micramphora and N. peltata.

=== Species ===
In addition to Cephalotus follicularis, the following 120 species and 5 undescribed taxa of Nepenthes are covered in the book.

1. N. adnata
2. N. alata
3. N. alba
4. N. albomarginata
5. N. ampullaria
6. N. angasanensis
7. N. argentii
8. N. aristolochioides
9. N. attenboroughii
10. N. beccariana
11. N. bellii
12. N. benstonei
13. N. bicalcarata
14. N. bokorensis
15. N. bongso
16. N. boschiana
17. N. burbidgeae
18. N. burkei
19. N. campanulata
20. N. chaniana
21. N. clipeata
22. N. copelandii
23. N. danseri
24. N. deaniana
25. N. densiflora
26. N. diatas
27. N. distillatoria
28. N. dubia
29. N. edwardsiana
30. N. ephippiata
31. N. eustachya
32. N. eymae
33. N. faizaliana
34. N. flava
35. N. fusca
36. N. glabrata
37. N. glandulifera
38. N. gracilis
39. N. gracillima
40. N. gymnamphora
41. N. hamata
42. N. hirsuta
43. N. hispida
44. N. hurrelliana
45. N. inermis
46. N. insignis
47. N. izumiae
48. N. jacquelineae
49. N. jamban
50. N. junghuhnii
51. N. kampotiana
52. N. khasiana
53. N. klossii
54. N. kongkandana
55. N. lamii
56. N. lavicola
57. N. lingulata
58. N. longifolia
59. N. lowii
60. N. macfarlanei
61. N. macrophylla
62. N. macrovulgaris
63. N. madagascariensis
64. N. mantalingajanensis
65. N. mapuluensis
66. N. masoalensis
67. N. maxima
68. N. merrilliana
69. N. micramphora
70. N. mikei
71. N. mindanaoensis
72. N. mira
73. N. mirabilis
74. N. mollis
75. N. muluensis
76. N. murudensis
77. N. naga
78. N. neoguineensis
79. N. northiana
80. N. ovata
81. N. paniculata
82. N. papuana
83. N. peltata
84. N. pervillei
85. N. petiolata
86. N. philippinensis
87. N. pilosa
88. N. pitopangii
89. N. platychila
90. N. rafflesiana
91. N. rajah
92. N. ramispina
93. N. reinwardtiana
94. N. rhombicaulis
95. N. rigidifolia
96. N. rowanae
97. N. sanguinea
98. N. saranganiensis
99. N. sibuyanensis
100. N. singalana
101. N. smilesii
102. N. spathulata
103. N. spectabilis
104. N. stenophylla
105. N. sumatrana
106. N. surigaoensis
107. N. talangensis
108. N. tenax
109. N. tentaculata
110. N. tenuis
111. N. thorelii
112. N. tobaica
113. N. tomoriana
114. N. treubiana
115. N. truncata
116. N. veitchii
117. N. ventricosa
118. N. vieillardii
119. N. villosa
120. N. vogelii

Incompletely diagnosed taxa

1. N. sp. Misool
2. N. sp. Papua (N. lamii)
3. N. sp. Phanga Nga (N. mirabilis var. globosa)
4. N. sp. Sulawesi (N. nigra)
5. N. sp. Trang (N. kerrii)

== Reviews ==
The book has been praised for its scope, detail, and high-quality photographs. In their review for the journal Phytotaxa, Maarten J. M. Christenhusz and Michael F. Fay wrote:

This is to date the only publication dealing with the genus Nepenthes throughout its geographical range. He [McPherson] humbly refers the reader to other taxonomic works, but these are all regional treatments. The level of information provided on all the species of Nepenthes is outstanding and has no precedent.
