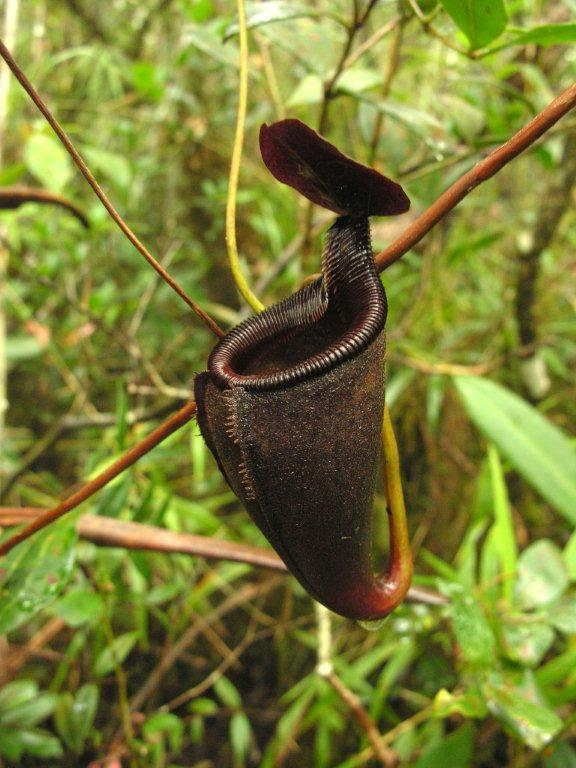
- An upper pitcher of a particularly dark variant of N. leonardoi, photographed by co-discoverer Stewart McPherson

Conservation status
- Least Concern (IUCN 3.1)

Scientific classification
- Kingdom: Plantae
- Clade: Tracheophytes
- Clade: Angiosperms
- Clade: Eudicots
- Order: Caryophyllales
- Family: Nepenthaceae
- Genus: Nepenthes
- Species: N. leonardoi

Binomial name
- Nepenthes leonardoi S.McPherson, Bourke, Cervancia, Jaunzems & A.S.Rob. (2011)

= Nepenthes leonardoi =

Species of pitcher plant from the Philippines

Nepenthes leonardoi is a tropical pitcher plant known from a single locality in central Palawan, the Philippines. It is closely allied to several other Palawan endemics, including N. deaniana, N. gantungensis, and N. mira. The traps of this species reach at least 24 cm in height. Some specimens are noted for producing very dark, almost black, upper pitchers.

In his Carnivorous Plant Database, taxonomist Jan Schlauer treats N. leonardoi as a heterotypic synonym of N. deaniana.

== Botanical history ==
Nepenthes leonardoi was discovered on November 18, 2010, by Greg Bourke, Jehson Cervancia, Mark Jaunzems, and Stewart McPherson. The species was initially known under the placeholder name "Nepenthes sp. Palawan".

Nepenthes leonardoi was formally described in the March 2011 issue of Carniflora Australis by McPherson, Bourke, Cervancia, Jaunzems, and Alastair Robinson. The specific epithet leonardoi honours Filipino botanist Leonardo Co, who was killed on the island of Leyte on November 15, 2010, reportedly as a result of "crossfire between government security forces and an insurgent group". The date of Co's death coincided with the first day of the Nepenthes expedition that led to the discovery of N. leonardoi. As explained in the species's describing paper:

The first four authors of this species discovered this plant on November 18th, and felt it fitting to name this plant, which is unique among Philippine Nepenthes in producing black pitchers, after Leonardo, in honour of his lifework and many accomplishments.

The herbarium specimen S. McPherson SRM 5 is the designated holotype, and is deposited at the herbarium of Palawan State University (PPC), Puerto Princesa City. It was collected on November 20, 2010, near the summit of Schom-carp Peak at 1,490 m. In preparing the species description, the describing authors also examined herbarium material of a number of closely allied species, including N. attenboroughii (specimens A.Robinson AR001 and AR002), N. mantalingajanensis (G.C.G.Argent & E.M.Romero 92114), N. mira (G.C.G.Argent et al. 25438), and N. rajah (Low s.n.).

== Description ==
Nepenthes leonardoi is a climbing or scrambling plant. The stem, which is unbranched, reaches a maximum length of around 4 m. It is cylindrical and varies in diameter from 1.5–2.8 cm. Internodes are typically 1.5–18 cm long, becoming elongated in climbing specimens. Plants found under the shade of dense vegetation typically have longer internodes compared to those growing in more open areas, although the latter on average bear larger pitchers and inflorescences.

=== Leaves ===
Leaves are petiolate to subpetiolate and coriaceous in texture. In mature plants, the lamina (leaf blade) is narrowly oblong and measures 15–50 cm in length by 6–10 cm in width. The laminar apex is typically acute or rounded, but may occasionally be abruptly truncated. The base may be shortly attenuate or obtuse, and encircles the stem for two-thirds to the entirety of its circumference.

In younger plants, the lamina is usually narrower towards the base, becoming more oblong as the plant matures. The apex may sometimes be slightly peltate, with the tendril joining the lamina on the underside, up to 4 mm before the apex. Occasionally the two halves of the lamina may meet the midrib unequally at different points along its length, up to 3 mm apart in some specimens.

Tendrils may be extremely long, sometimes exceeding 130 cm, particularly on leaves bearing lower pitchers. Those supporting upper pitchers are coiled.

=== Pitchers ===
Rosette and lower pitchers are variable in shape: they are usually wholly ovate or urceolate, but may also be globose. They grow up to 15 cm high by 6 cm wide, but are often considerably smaller. A pair of wings up to 12 mm wide runs down the ventral surface of the pitcher cup. These wings bear filiform fringe elements up to 10 mm long. The pitcher mouth is oval to circular and up to 6 cm across. It rises at the rear to form a conspicuous neck. The peristome is cylindrical to slightly flattened and up to 2 cm wide for most of its length, becoming broader towards the neck (≤2.5 cm wide). It bears ribs up to 2 mm high and spaced up to 2 mm apart, which terminate in teeth (≤4 mm long) on the peristome's inner margin. The digestive zone of the inner surface usually extends for around two-thirds of the pitcher's height, although some specimens may be wholly glandular. The pitcher lid or operculum is elliptic and measures up to 5.5 cm in length by 3.5 cm in width. It lacks appendages or a keel. A spur is inserted near the base of the lid. It measures up to 9 mm in length, with a basal diameter of up to 3 mm, although it may be much smaller.

Upper pitchers are variably funnel-shaped, ranging from wholly infundibular to infundibular only in the basal quarter and cylindrical, or more rarely tubular, above. They may be considerably larger than their terrestrial counterparts, reaching 24 cm in height by 6 cm in width, though they rarely approach these maximum dimensions. The wings are commonly reduced to a pair of ribs in aerial traps. Upper pitchers resemble lower ones in other respects.

=== Inflorescence ===
Nepenthes leonardoi is known to flower both in the rosette stage and as a vining plant. The species has a racemose inflorescence. Male inflorescences can reach a height of 50 cm, of which the rachis constitutes up to 30 cm. Female inflorescences are similar in size, typically growing to 45 cm in length. Generally both male and female inflorescences are much shorter, however, especially in the case of plants growing in exposed sites. This being the case, exceptional specimens (also found in exposed areas) may produce a rigid inflorescence up to 110 cm length, of which only the distal 15% bears flowers. Inflorescences of both sexes have a basal diameter of approximately 1 cm and hold up to around 120 closely packed flowers, which are usually restricted to the distal quarter to half of its length. Flowers are usually borne on one-flowered pedicels, although two-flowered partial peduncles may also be present. The inflorescence often bears a vestigial leaf below the rachis. Male flowers are fragrant; their scent has been described as "distinctive, musty, sweet" and is noticeable from a distance of up to 60 cm. The smell of female flowers has not been recorded. Fruits are up to 8 mm long. As in most Nepenthes species, the seeds are filiform. They are pale brown and around 7 mm long.

=== Indumentum ===
A sparse indumentum of simple, reddish-brown hairs is present on certain vegetative parts, including the outside of the pitchers, the laminar margins, the lower surface of the midrib, and the tendrils (where they are somewhat more densely distributed). These hairs may be 2 mm long, but are typically shorter. They are caducous, being lost with age. Consequently, the laminar margins and midrib are particularly hirsute in developing leaves.

=== Colour ===
Colouration is highly variable. The laminae and petioles are often green throughout when produced in shaded conditions and red to purple in plants exposed to direct sunlight. In certain specimens the underside of the lamina and/or the stem may be red to purple, but this is uncommon. A red tinge to the stem is already apparent in many juvenile plants.

The range of colours displayed by the pitchers of N. leonardoi is exceptional among Philippine Nepenthes. Lower pitchers are most commonly orange to red on their outer surfaces, often flecked with slightly darker purple markings. The wings may match the external pigmentation of the pitcher cup or be yellowish-green. The peristome is often red and may turn purple with age. The lid is yellow to orange, frequently with red highlights.

In aerial traps, the pitcher cup is predominantly yellowish-green with a darker, orange to red peristome. In certain specimens the upper pitchers may be faintly red speckled. Beyond this common pigmentation, both lower and upper pitchers exhibit a continuum of colours across the species, from wholly yellowish-green at one extreme to entirely burgundy at the other. The latter colour form is particularly striking and is far more frequently encountered in N. leonardoi than in any other closely allied Philippine Nepenthes. In extreme cases, the upper pitchers may look almost completely black. Flash photography shows the actual colour of the pitcher cup to be a uniform deep purple; their very dark appearance seems to result from a combination of this purple pigmentation and their brown indumentum. This effect is particularly pronounced in wet pitchers.

== Ecology ==
Nepenthes leonardoi is endemic to the Philippine island of Palawan. It has only been recorded from the upper slopes of a single mountain system centred on Schom-carp Peak (also known as Shumkat Peak or Shumkak Peak); it grows on the peak itself as well as on its eastern ridge, which extends in the direction of Narra municipality. The presence of this species on the easterly ridge connecting Schom-carp Peak with the Brow Shoulder massif could not be confirmed by the describing authors, but they suggested it is likely to grow there and possibly on the massif itself. The altitudinal distribution of N. leonardoi ranges from at least 1,300 m above sea level to the summit of Schom-carp at 1,490 m. The only known population numbers several thousand individuals.

Nepenthes leonardoi is exclusively terrestrial. Its typical habitat is upper montane forest (on the eastern ridge) and upper montane scrub (in the summit area of Schom-carp Peak). It is not sympatric with other Nepenthes species and no natural hybrids have been recorded. Like its close relatives,^{[note a]} N. leonardoi is apparently outcompeted by bamboo and is consequently largely or completely absent from the highest parts of the eastern ridge. The infaunal community of N. leonardoi pitchers includes small spiders and unidentified mosquito larvae, the latter being found in abundance in both lower and upper pitchers.

The conservation status of N. leonardoi has not been formally assessed for the IUCN Red List, but the describing authors suggested it be considered Critically Endangered based on the IUCN criteria, due to its localised distribution and small population size. Although the habitat of N. leonardoi remains untouched by human activity, the describing authors cited mining operations to the south, on the Mount Victoria massif (to which N. attenboroughii is endemic), as a possible future threat if appropriate conservation measures are not taken.

== Notes ==
a. Similar outcomes of interspecific competition with bamboo have been observed in N. attenboroughii, N. deaniana, N. gantungensis, N. mantalingajanensis, N. mira, and N. palawanensis.
