= Thumb Peak (Palawan) =

Mountain in the Philippines

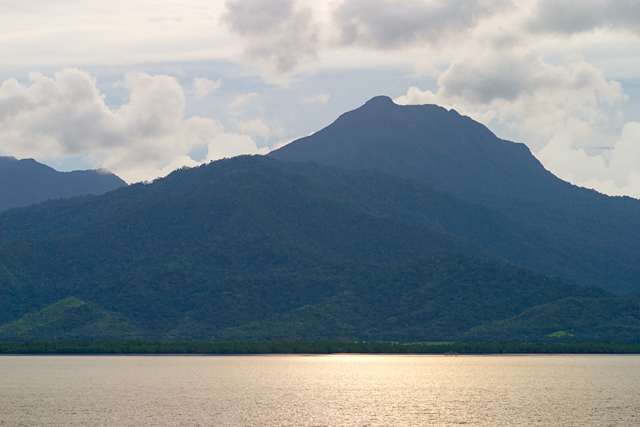
- Thumb Peak as seen from Puerto Princesa, 9 July 2007

Highest point
- Elevation: 1,296 m (4,252 ft)
- Prominence: 1,296 m (4,252 ft)
- Coordinates: 9°47′55.4″N 118°36′20.4″E

Geography
- Location within Philippines
- Location: Palawan
- Country: Philippines
- Region: Mimaropa
- Province: Palawan
- Parent range: Thumb Range

Thumb Peak is a small mountain in central Palawan, Philippines, and is the highest point in the Thumb Range. Like Mount Mantalingahan and Mount Victoria further south, Thumb Peak is part of the Mount Beaufort Ultramafics geological area, a series of ultramafic outcrops of Eocene origin that emerge in various parts of the island.

The mountain was formerly known as Mount Pulgar, a name it acquired during the Spanish Colonial period. Pulgar, means thumb in Spanish, and the name was probably translated directly to English following the ousting of Spain during the Spanish–American War. The name may have arisen as a result of the mountain's profile, which vaguely resembles the tip of a thumb protruding from a clenched fist.

The upper reaches of Thumb Peak are populated by species associated with ultramafic soils, including a number of endemics, such as the tropical pitcher plant Nepenthes deaniana, rediscovered on the mountain in 2007 for the first time since its description in 1908.

== Hiking activity ==
Thumb Peak is accessible from the Iwahig Penal Colony as a 2–3 day hike, graded Difficulty 7/9 by local mountaineering website PinoyMountaineer.com. Highlights of the trail include river crossings, trekking through dense forests, and beautiful views at the summit. A permit is required to climb the mountain.
