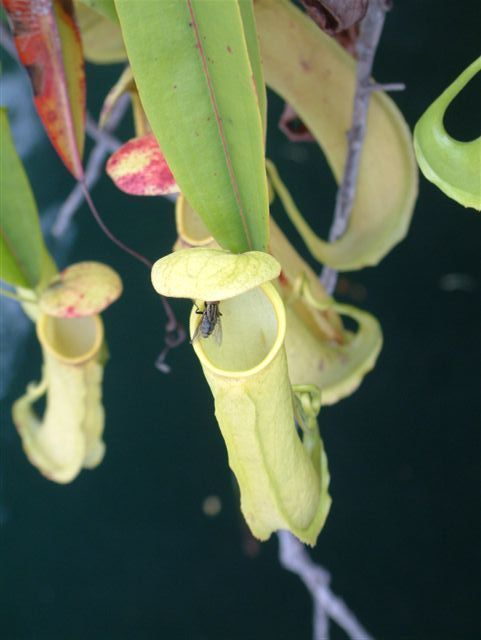
- Upper pitchers of Nepenthes sp. Misool

Scientific classification
- Kingdom: Plantae
- Clade: Tracheophytes
- Clade: Angiosperms
- Clade: Eudicots
- Order: Caryophyllales
- Family: Nepenthaceae
- Genus: Nepenthes
- Species: N. sp. Misool

Binomial name
- Nepenthes sp. Misool

= Nepenthes sp. Misool =

Species of pitcher plant from Indonesia

Nepenthes sp. Misool is an undescribed tropical pitcher plant found on the island of Misool in the Raja Ampat archipelago of Indonesia. It is similar to the extremely variable N. neoguineensis.

Nepenthes sp. Misool is not currently threatened in the wild. In Pitcher Plants of the Old World, Stewart McPherson writes:

Misool remains difficult and expensive to reach; during my observations, I hired a local fishing boat to travel to the island, and this trip alone required one metric ton of fuel!
