= Nepenthes megastoma =

Conservation status
- Critically Endangered (IUCN 3.1)

Scientific classification
- Kingdom: Plantae
- Clade: Tracheophytes
- Clade: Angiosperms
- Clade: Eudicots
- Order: Caryophyllales
- Family: Nepenthaceae
- Genus: Nepenthes
- Species: N. megastoma

Binomial name
- Nepenthes megastoma A.S.Rob., R.Bustam. & Altomonte, 2025

Species of pitcher plant

Nepenthes megastoma is a species of pitcher plant endemic to the limestone karst of the Puerto Princesa Subterranean River National Park, in the island province of Palawan in the Philippines. It was discovered in 2025.
