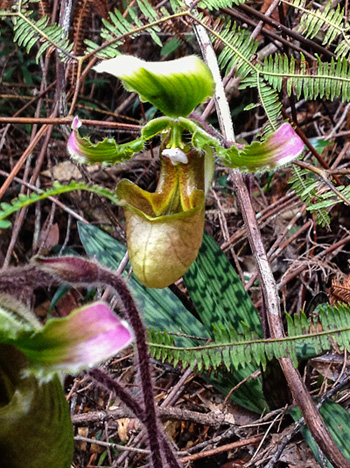
- Paphiopedilum robinsonianum growing wild in Sulawesi

Scientific classification
- Kingdom: Plantae
- Clade: Tracheophytes
- Clade: Angiosperms
- Clade: Monocots
- Order: Asparagales
- Family: Orchidaceae
- Subfamily: Cypripedioideae
- Genus: Paphiopedilum
- Species: P. robinsonianum

Binomial name
- Paphiopedilum robinsonianum Cavestro

= Paphiopedilum robinsonianum =

Species of orchid

Paphiopedilum robinsonianum is a species of slipper orchid endemic to Sulawesi, Indonesia, where it is known from two mountains in the regency of Central Sulawesi. It is restricted to tropical montane forest habitat at approximately 1400 metres altitude.

== Nomenclature ==
The specific epithet robinsonianum should not be confused with robinsonii. Paphiopedilum robinsonii (Ridl.) Ridl. is a synonym of Paphiopedilum bullenianum. Similarly, Paphiopedilum Robinsonianum (note capitalized spelling) is an invalid hybrid name synonymous with P. Euryale (P. lawrenceanum × superbiens).

Paphiopedilum robinsonianum is named after the botanist, Dr. Alastair Robinson, who brought the species to the attention of other taxonomists specializing in Paphiopedilum orchids. The authors mention that late in the naming process, Robinson sent word from another botanist, Ch'ien Lee, indicating that the plant had been photographed in the wild on one previous occasion on a nearby mountain, thus showing that the species has a wider distribution than initially thought.
