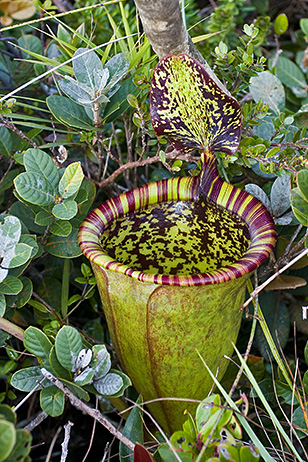
- A lower pitcher of N. attenboroughii showing the characteristic bell-shaped pitchers and upright lid of this species

Conservation status
- Critically Endangered (IUCN 3.1)

Scientific classification
- Kingdom: Plantae
- Clade: Embryophytes
- Clade: Tracheophytes
- Clade: Angiosperms
- Clade: Eudicots
- Order: Caryophyllales
- Family: Nepenthaceae
- Genus: Nepenthes
- Species: N. attenboroughii

Binomial name
- Nepenthes attenboroughii A.S.Rob., S.McPherson & V.B.Heinrich (2009)

= Nepenthes attenboroughii =

Species of pitcher plant from the Philippines

Nepenthes attenboroughii (/nɪˈpɛnθiːz ˌætənˈbʌriaɪ, - ˌætənbəˈroʊɡiaɪ/ nih-PEN-theez AT-ən-BURR-ee-eye , - AT-ən-bə-ROH-ghee-eye), or Attenborough's pitcher plant, is a montane species of carnivorous pitcher plant of the genus Nepenthes. It is named after the celebrated broadcaster and naturalist Sir David Attenborough, who is a keen enthusiast of the genus. The species is characterised by its large and distinctive bell-shaped lower and upper pitchers and narrow, upright lid. The type specimen of N. attenboroughii was collected on the summit of Mount Victoria, an ultramafic mountain in central Palawan, the Philippines.

In May 2010, the International Institute for Species Exploration at Arizona State University selected N. attenboroughii as one of the "top 10 new species described in 2009". The species appeared on the 2012 list of the world's 100 most threatened species compiled by the IUCN Species Survival Commission in collaboration with the Zoological Society of London.

== Botanical history ==
Nepenthes attenboroughii was discovered by Alastair Robinson, Stewart R. McPherson and Volker B. Heinrich in June 2007, during a 2 month research expedition to catalogue the different species of pitcher plant found across the Philippine Archipelago. The expedition was initiated after missionaries reported seeing giant Nepenthes on the mountain in 2000.

The formal description of N. attenboroughii was published in February 2009 in the Botanical Journal of the Linnean Society. The herbarium specimen A. Robinson AR001 is the designated holotype, and is deposited at the herbarium of Palawan State University (PPC), Puerto Princesa City.

Further accounts of this species appeared in McPherson's Pitcher Plants of the Old World, published in May 2009, and in the December 2009 issue of the Carnivorous Plant Newsletter.

== Description ==
Nepenthes attenboroughii is a terrestrial upright or scrambling shrub. The stem, which may be up to 3.5 cm thick, is circular in cross section and attains a height of up to 1.5 m.

=== Leaves and pitchers ===
The leaves are coriaceous and sessile or sub-petiolate. The leaves of rosettes are up to 30 cm long and 10 cm wide, whereas those of the scrambling stem are up to 40 cm long and 15 cm wide. The leaves are oblong to elliptic, obtuse at the apex and shortly attenuate at the base, clasping the stem by approximately two-thirds of its circumference and becoming decurrent for 2–3 cm.

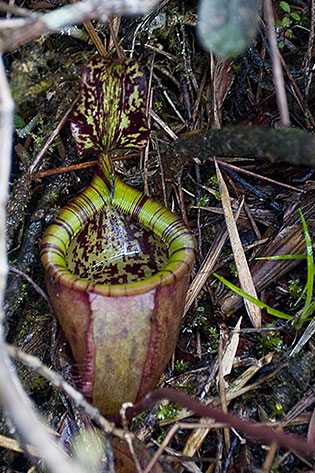
The rosette (juvenile) pitchers of N. attenboroughii demonstrate the typical bell shape of this species when only a few inches high

Nepenthes attenboroughii produces some of the largest pitchers in the genus, sometimes exceeding those of typical N. rajah in size, but is not known to have exceeded the size and volume records set by that species. The largest recorded pitcher of N. attenboroughii measured more than 1.5 litres in volume, and traps exceeding 2 litres are likely to be produced on occasion. The lower pitchers are brittle and campanulate (bell-shaped), up to 30 cm tall and 16 cm wide and emerge from tendrils that are 30–40 cm long and 4–9 mm in diameter. The tendrils are flattened towards the leaf, making them almost semi-circular in cross section.

The upper pitchers are similar to the lower pitchers, but generally infundibular, to 25 cm tall and 12 cm wide.

The pitchers show considerable variation in both shape and colouration, ranging from green or yellow to dark purple throughout.

=== Inflorescence ===
Nepenthes attenboroughii has a racemose inflorescence up to 80 cm long. The male flower spike bears approximately 100 pedicellate flowers on a rachis up to 45 cm long and is recorded to bifurcate on occasion. The flowers lack bracts and produce red tepals that are broadly ovate with an obtuse apex.

The female inflorescence is shorter, to 65 cm long, never bifurcates, and bears up to 70 densely arranged flowers on a compact rachis up to 20 cm long. The tepals are brown to purple, ovate, and have an acute apex.

== Distribution and habitat ==
This species is endemic to the Victoria Massif in Palawan. There, it grows from 1450 m above sea level to the summit of Mount Victoria at 1726 m. Originally known only from Mount Victoria itself, it has since been found on the largest peak of the Victoria Massif, Mount Sagpaw, and along the connecting ridges from the site of first collection. The species is found among shrubs 0.8–1.8 m tall in relatively scattered populations of plants on rocky, ultramafic soil. It is not sympatric with other Nepenthes species and no natural hybrids have been recorded.

The summit flora of Mount Victoria includes Leptospermum sp., Medinilla spp., Dracaena sp., Vaccinium sp., various grasses, as well as the sundew Drosera ultramafica, which grows at similar elevations to N. attenboroughii.

== Conservation ==
Nepenthes attenboroughii is assessed as Critically Endangered by the World Conservation Union (IUCN) on account of its restricted distribution and the threat posed by plant poachers.

== Carnivory ==
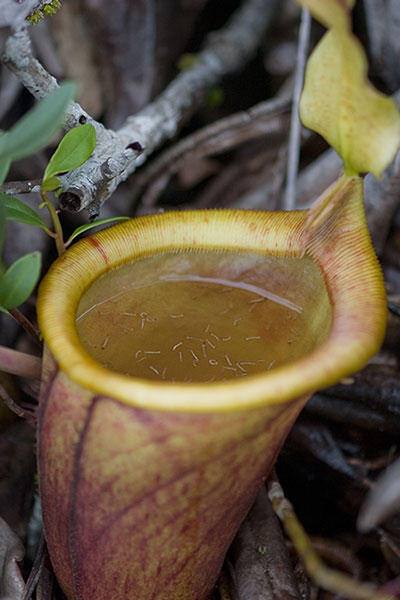
A lower pitcher of N. attenboroughii supporting a large population of mosquito larvae

The pitchers of N. attenboroughii are open to the elements and thus often completely filled with fluid. This fluid is viscous in the lower part of the pitcher and watery above, forming two fractions that do not mix. The upper fraction supports populations of pitcher infauna, particularly mosquito larvae, and the pitchers of this species may benefit from both the usual capture of prey as well as the detritus produced by organisms living within the pitcher fluid.

In the latter half of 2009, this taxon received a great deal of publicity in the national press of various countries as a sensational new plant that catches and kills rats. Whilst certainly large enough to trap rodents, no rodents of any kind had, at that time, been observed within the pitchers of this species, as indicated in the type description and through subsequent clarification by the author, Alastair Robinson, who suggested that were rodents to be captured by the plant, it was likely to be through misadventure rather than by design, large bugs and flying insects appearing to be the usual prey.

In October 2012, however, a dead shrew was found in a pitcher of Nepenthes attenboroughii during a return expedition to Mount Victoria by Robinson and a group of naturalists. Yet another visit almost two months later, in December 2012, allowed the botanist to assess and document the rate of digestion on video. It was found that the corpse of the shrew had, in the intervening weeks, progressed from a wholly intact state to mere skeletal remains, with only scant viscera and a matte of hair at the bottom of the pitcher still apparent.

== Related species ==
Botanist Alastair Robinson examines the pitcher contents of N. attenboroughii on Mount Victoria, wherein the remains of a newly killed terrestrial shrew identified in the pitcher in October 2012 have been largely digested by December of the same year.

Nepenthes attenboroughii is closely related to the Palawan species, N. deaniana, N. leonardoi, N. mantalingajanensis, N. mira, and N. palawanensis (which produces even larger pitchers), to N. peltata from Mindanao, and to N. rajah from Borneo.

The stated relationship of this taxon with species from Borneo and Mindanao agrees with observations made in the description of N. mira, and is further supported in the type description of N. attenboroughii by previously overlooked paleogeographical evidence. Based on this evidence, the authors reason that these species, predominantly found growing on ultramafic soils on Palawan and Mindanao, are likely to have arisen as a result of the radiative speciation of a common ancestor in Borneo.

== See also ==
- List of things named after David Attenborough and his works
