= Carniflora Australis =

- Volume 7, issue 1 (March 2009)
- Discipline: Botany
- Language: English
- Edited by: Greg Bourke

Publication details
- History: 2003–September 2014
- Publisher: Australasian Carnivorous Plant Society (Australia)
- Frequency: Biannual

Standard abbreviations
- ISO 4: Carniflora Aust.

Indexing
- ISSN: 1448-9570
- OCLC no.: 53959671

Links
- Journal homepage

Carniflora Australis was a biannual English-language periodical and the official publication of the Australasian Carnivorous Plant Society. Typical articles included matters of horticultural interest, field reports, and scientific studies.

The journal was established in March 2003. It published in full colour and totals around 64 pages annually. The last issue appeared in September 2014.

== Taxon descriptions ==
Carniflora Australis published the formal description of Nepenthes bokorensis in its March 2009 issue and of Nepenthes leonardoi in the March 2011 issue.
