= Nepenthes ridzana =

Scientific classification
- Kingdom: Plantae
- Clade: Tracheophytes
- Clade: Angiosperms
- Clade: Eudicots
- Order: Caryophyllales
- Family: Nepenthaceae
- Genus: Nepenthes
- Species: N. ridzana

Binomial name
- Nepenthes ridzana Latiff, M.N.Faizal & Besi, 2024

Species of pitcher plant endemic to Malaysia

Nepenthes ridzana is a species of tropical pitcher plant known from Gunung Matchinchang, in Langkawi Island, Kedah, Malaysia.

== Etymology ==
The specific epithet is derived in honor of Dato' Indera Mohd. Ridza Awang, a Director-General of the Forestry Department of Peninsular Malaysia, for his role in supporting the forest conservation in Peninsular Malaysia.

== Nomenclature ==
The species was originally described under the name Nepenthes ridzaiana in volume 87, issue 1 of The Malaysian Forester.

== Natural hybrid ==
A known natural hybrid, Nepenthes × langkawiensis Latiff, M.N. Faizal & Besi, is recorded from Teluk Datai on the same island, with Nepenthes mirabilis as the other parent species.
