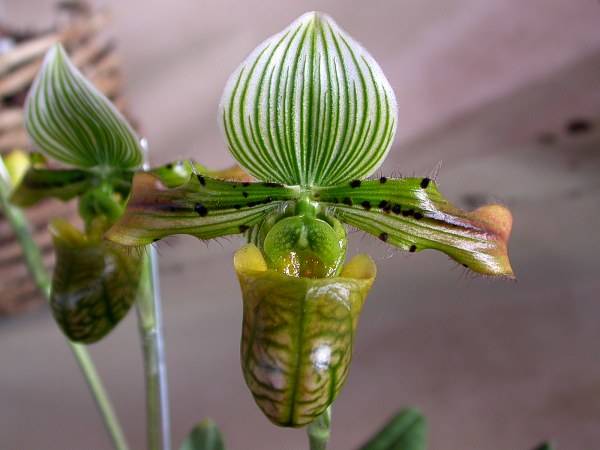
- Flower of Paphiopedilum venustum

Scientific classification
- Kingdom: Plantae
- Clade: Tracheophytes
- Clade: Angiosperms
- Clade: Monocots
- Order: Asparagales
- Family: Orchidaceae
- Subfamily: Cypripedioideae
- Genus: Paphiopedilum
- Species: P. venustum

Binomial name
- Paphiopedilum venustum (Wall. ex Sims) Pfitzer

Synonyms
- Cypripedium venustum Wall. ex Sims (basionym); Stimegas venustum (Wall. ex Sims) Raf.; Cypripedium pardinum Rchb.f.; Cypripedium venustum var. measuresianum auct.; Paphiopedilum pardinum (Rchb.f.) Pfitzer; Paphiopedilum venustum var. pardinum (Rchb.f.) Pfitzer; Cordula venusta (Wall. ex Sims) Rolfe; Paphiopedilum venustum var. bhutanensis Pradhan; Paphiopedilum venustum var. rubrum Pradhan; Paphiopedilum venustum var. teestaensis Pradhan; Paphiopedilum venustum f. measuresianum (auct.) Braem; Paphiopedilum venustum f. pardinum (Rchb.f.) Braem

= Paphiopedilum venustum =

Species of orchid

Paphiopedilum venustum is a species of orchid ranging from eastern Nepal to northeastern Bangladesh.

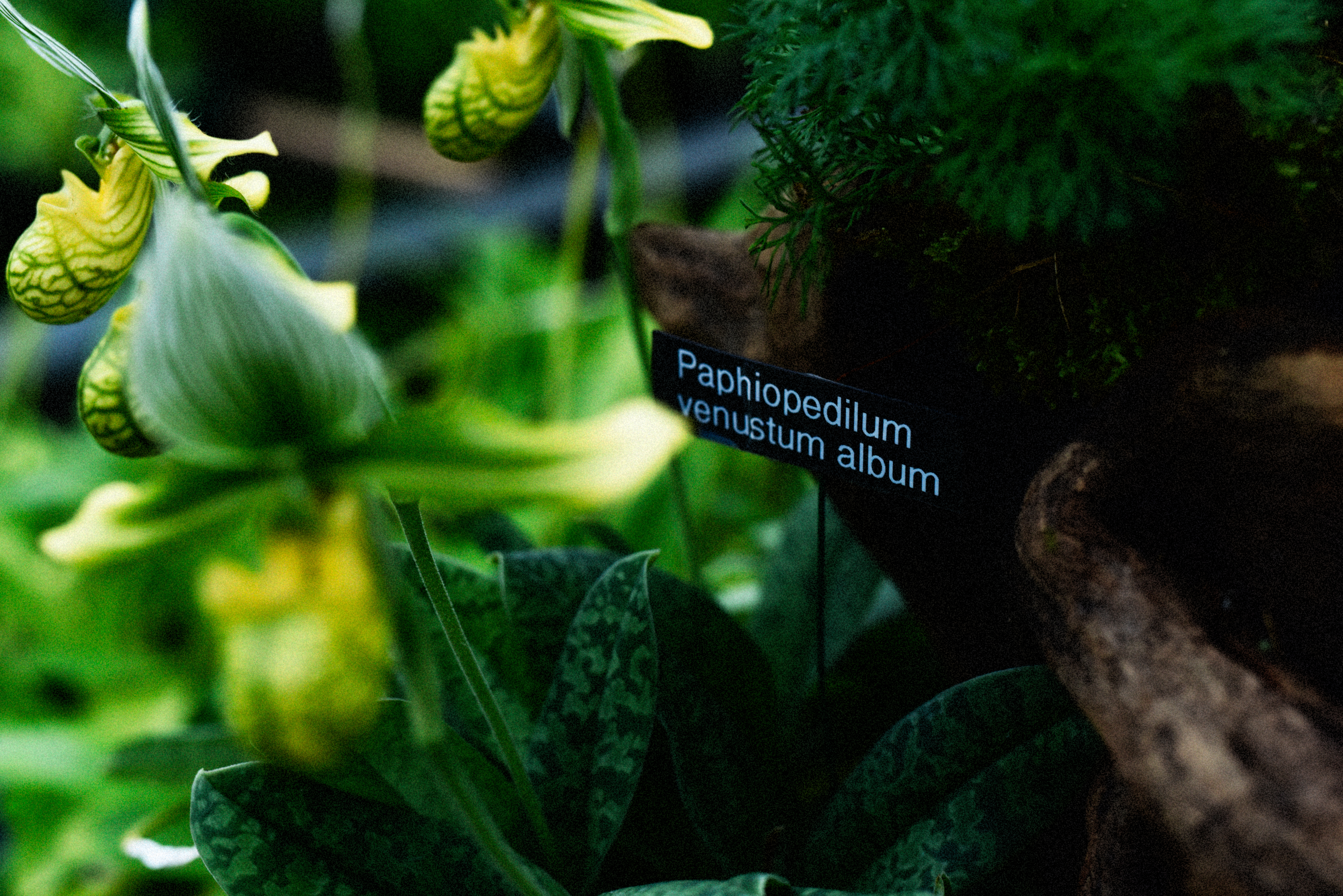
Paphiopedilum venustum album in an Easton, CT greenhouse.

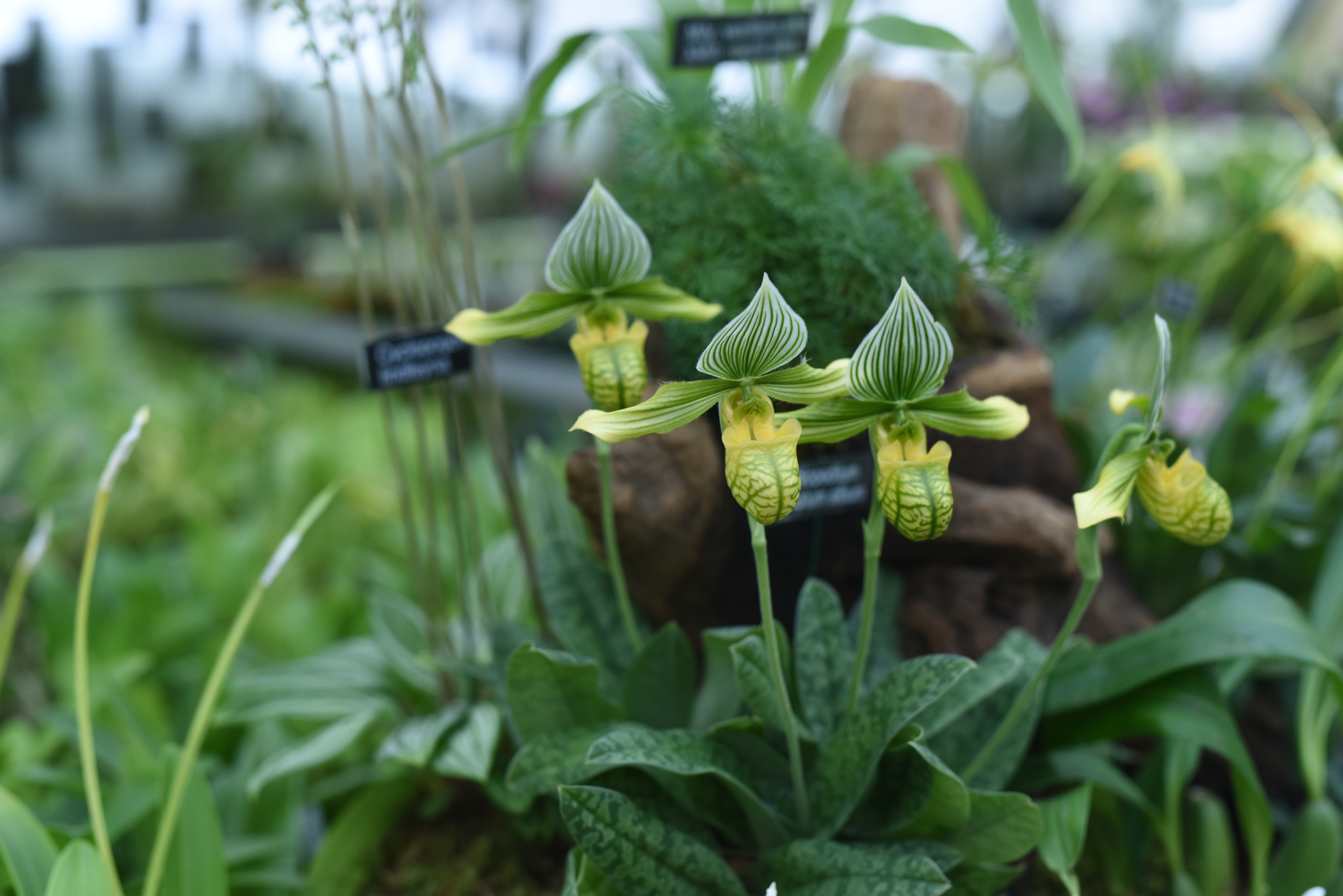
Paphiopedilum venustum album is an orchid that grows best in warm low light conditions.
