= Paphiopedilum papuanum =

Conservation status
- Endangered (IUCN 3.1)

Scientific classification
- Kingdom: Plantae
- Clade: Tracheophytes
- Clade: Angiosperms
- Clade: Monocots
- Order: Asparagales
- Family: Orchidaceae
- Subfamily: Cypripedioideae
- Genus: Paphiopedilum
- Species: P. papuanum

Binomial name
- Paphiopedilum papuanum (Ridl.) L.O.Williams

Species of orchid

Paphiopedilum papuanum is a rare species of orchid in the genus Paphiopedilum. Commonly known as the Papua paphiopedilum, it is endemic to the highlands of New Guinea and is considered one of the rarest Paphiopedilum species in cultivation. The species is named after its country of origin, Papua New Guinea.

== Description ==
Paphiopedilum papuanum is a terrestrial herbaceous orchid. It has 4 to 6 oblong to oblong-elliptic leaves that are 6.5-22 cm long and 2-4.2 cm wide. The leaves are mottled with tessellated dark and light green patterns and have obtuse, tridenticulate apices.

The species produces a solitary flower on a reddish or purple, pubescent inflorescence that ranges from 15 to 28 cm in length. The floral bract is ovate, pubescent, and 1.2-1.5 cm long. The flower itself is 6-9 cm wide. The dorsal sepal is ovate, acute, white with a yellowish or greenish center and purplish veins, and is 2.4-2.5 cm long by 1.8-2.6 cm wide. The synsepal is elliptic-lanceolate and subacute. Petals are dull maroon with black spots in the yellowish basal half, oblong-oblanceolate in shape, and 4-4.2 cm long. The lip is dull crimson or brownish maroon, measuring 2.5-3.7 cm long. The staminode is transversely lunate, 4-5 mm long by 6 mm wide, and notched above with short, blunt apical teeth.

The plant typically blooms in the summer and fall.

== Distribution and habitat ==
This orchid is endemic to New Guinea, where it occurs in three known subpopulations: Mount Carstensz (Puncak Jaya), the Arfak Mountains, and the Southern Highlands Province of Papua New Guinea. It inhabits the lower montane forests between 800 and 1,700 meters in elevation.

Paphiopedilum papuanum grows in leaf litter and humus-rich soils, often over limestone or granitic substrates, in shaded or partially sunny spots. The local climate is characterized by heavy rains during winter and spring, with persistent humidity year-round.

== Taxonomy ==
The species was originally described as Cypripedium papuanum by Ridley in 1915 and later transferred to Paphiopedilum by L.O. Williams in 1946. It has also been redescribed as Paphiopedilum zieckianum by Gustav Schoser in 1967, but this name is now considered a synonym.

== Conservation ==
Paphiopedilum papuanum is listed as Endangered on the IUCN Red List. The estimated number of mature individuals is fewer than 50, spread across three isolated subpopulations. Its area of occupancy is estimated at only 50 km².

The species faces several severe threats, including illegal collection for the horticultural trade, habitat destruction from logging and deforestation, and hybridization pressures. These pressures have caused an estimated population reduction of up to 80% over the last three generations, and similar declines are projected for the future.

All Paphiopedilum species are included in Appendix I of the Convention on International Trade in Endangered Species of Wild Fauna and Flora (CITES), which prohibits international commercial trade in wild-collected specimens.

== Cultivation ==
Paphiopedilum papuanum is one of the rarest orchids in cultivation. Most plants in the trade under this name are actually color variants of Paphiopedilum violascens, a closely related species. The true P. papuanum is very difficult to grow from seed, though limited success with artificial propagation has been reported.

The species prefers intermediate to warm temperatures (18–23°C), moderate to bright indirect light, and humidity levels of 60–80%. It grows best in a loose, well-draining substrate such as fir bark mixed with perlite.
