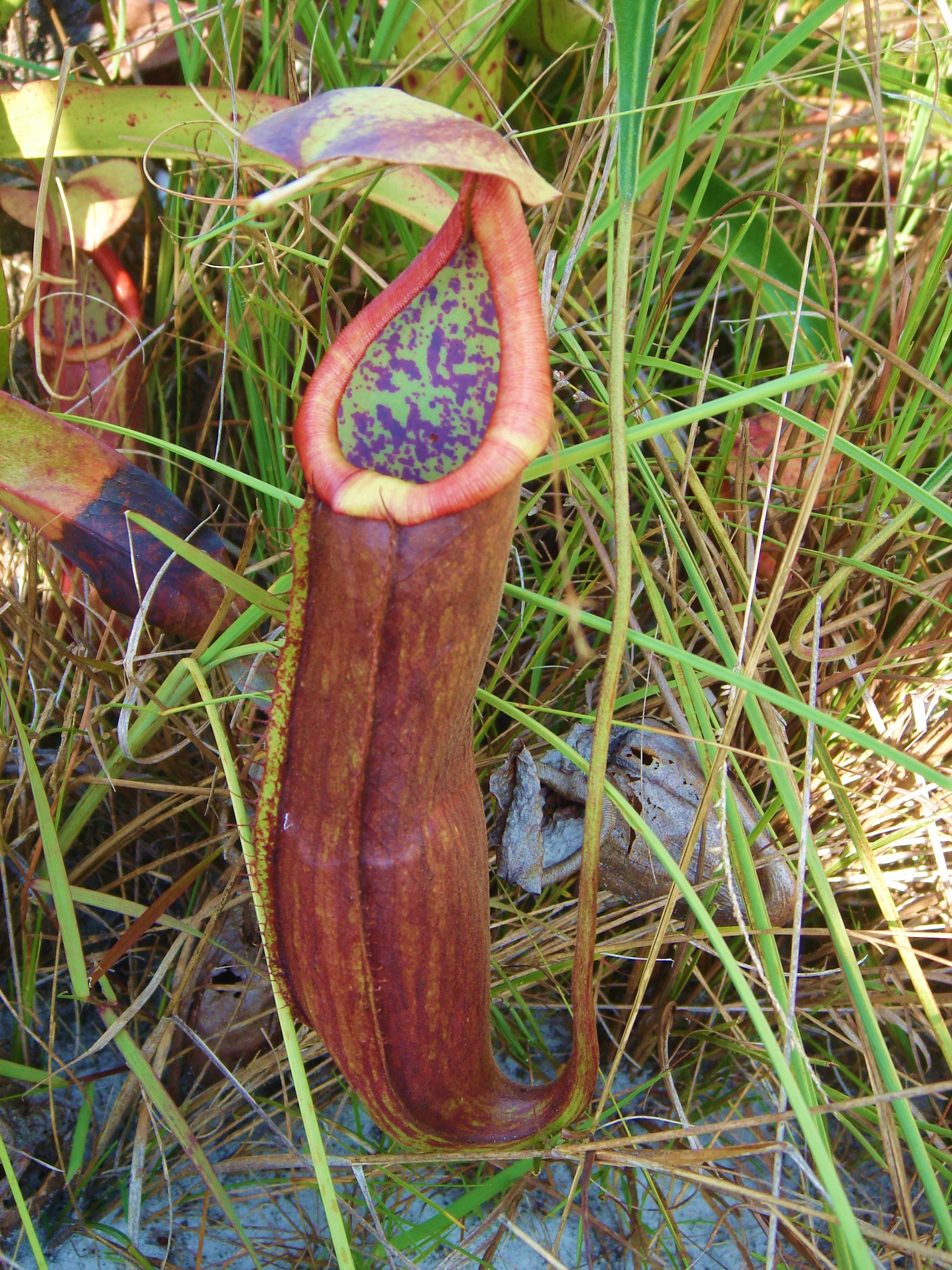
- An intermediate pitcher of Nepenthes kongkandana

Scientific classification
- Kingdom: Plantae
- Clade: Tracheophytes
- Clade: Angiosperms
- Clade: Eudicots
- Order: Caryophyllales
- Family: Nepenthaceae
- Genus: Nepenthes
- Species: N. kongkandana

Binomial name
- Nepenthes kongkandana M.Catal. & Kruetr. (2015)

= Nepenthes kongkandana =

Species of pitcher plant from Southeast Asia

Nepenthes kongkandana is a tropical pitcher plant endemic to Songkhla Province in southern Thailand. It is closely related to N. kerrii.

== Natural hybrids ==
- N. kongkandana × N. mirabilis
