= Mount Mantalingajan =

Mountain in Palawan, Philippines

- Mantalingahan
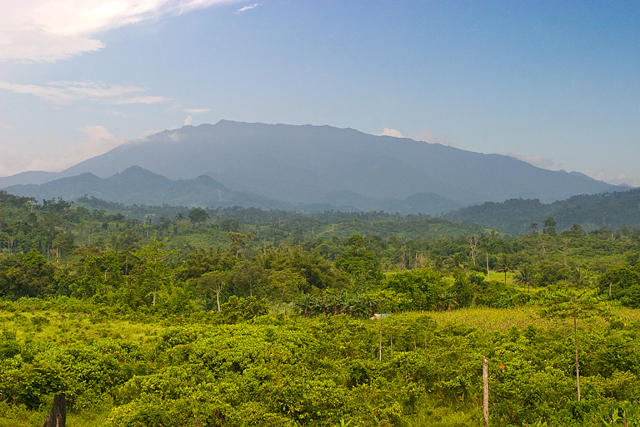
- The mountain as seen from Ransang, 4 July 2007

Highest point
- Elevation: 6,844 ft (2,086 m)
- Prominence: 6,844 ft (2,086 m)
- Listing: 1st-highest point in Palawan; 10th-most prominent mountain in the Philippines; 68th-highest peak of an island in the world; Ultra prominent peak; Ribu
- Coordinates: 8°49′06″N 117°40′11″E

Geography
- Location within Palawan Location within Philippines
- Location: Palawan
- Country: Philippines
- Region: Mimaropa
- Province: Palawan
- City/municipality: Brooke's Point
- Parent range: Mantalingahan Range

Mount Mantalingajan (or Mantalingahan or Mantaling) is the highest mountain in the island province of Palawan in the Philippines, with an elevation of 6,844 ft (2,086 m) above sea level, its ranked 68th-highest peak of an island on Earth and 10th-most prominent mountain in the Philippines. Located in the southern part of Palawan Island that forms the highest part of the Beaufort Mountains Ultramafics geological region, a series of ultramafic outcrops of Eocene origin, of which Mount Victoria forms the largest contiguous land area. The peak of the mountain is the highest point on Palawan island.

The mountain forms the center of the Mount Mantalingahan Protected Landscape (MMPL), a national park covering the entire Mantalingahan Mountain Range. The protected area status of MMPL was proclaimed on June 23, 2009, by virtue of Proclamation No. 1815. The protected area covers an area of 120,457 hectares (1,204.57 km^{2}). The entire park is currently listed as a tentative site for UNESCO World Heritage Site inscription. During the establishment process for the Mount Mantalingahan protected landscape, local governments sought technical assistance from the Department of Environment and Natural Resources and Conservation International Philippines.

Continuing discoveries of new species of plant and animal from the mountain highlight its tremendous ecological value and the importance of maintaining such protective zones in the face of constant logging and mining pressures. The pitcher plant species, Nepenthes mantalingajanensis, described in 2007, is named after the mountain itself. In May 2018, UNESCO formally began the process which would possibly declare the landscape a world heritage site by 2020.

== Indigenous peoples ==
Mount Mantalingajan is home to the Indigenous Palawan people.

== Hiking activity ==
Mount Mantalingajan is one of the most difficult climbs in the Philippines, being graded Difficulty 9/9 by local mountaineering website PinoyMountaineer.com. The usual route starts from Barangay Ransang in Rizal on the south-west coast of Palawan. Three days hiking is required to reach the summit and two days to return to the jump-off, a total of five days, unless another day is wanted exploring the summit and surrounds. Highlights of the trail include encounters with the Tau't Bato tribe and the "Knife Edge" Canopy Walk that leads to the summit.

== See also ==
- List of ultras of the Philippines
- List of protected areas of the Philippines
