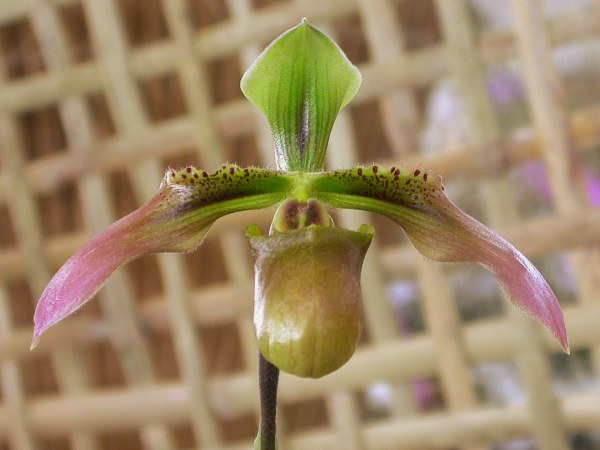

Conservation status
- Endangered (IUCN 3.1)

Scientific classification
- Kingdom: Plantae
- Clade: Tracheophytes
- Clade: Angiosperms
- Clade: Monocots
- Order: Asparagales
- Family: Orchidaceae
- Subfamily: Cypripedioideae
- Genus: Paphiopedilum
- Species: P. bullenianum

Binomial name
- Paphiopedilum bullenianum (Rchb.f.) Pfitzer

Synonyms
- Cypripedium bullenianum Rchb.f. (basionym); Cordula bulleniana (Rchb.f.) Rolfe

= Paphiopedilum bullenianum =

Species of orchid

Paphiopedilum bullenianum is a species of slipper orchid native to equatorial Malesia. Numerous hybrids were successfully cultivated with this species.

== Taxonomy ==
P. bullenianum was originally described by Reichenbach as Cypripedium bullenianum in 1865, before being reclassified into Paphiopedilum in 1894. P. bullenianum has numerous forms throughout its habitat that is notably contested in taxonomy, with taxonomists debated whether those forms should be designated as variants or separate species. So far, only a single form is officially recognized as a variant, the Sulawesi form, as P. bullenianum var. celebesense. Typically, the Borneo version is taken as the "proper" P. bullenianum for reference.

== Description ==
P. bullenianum consists of 6 to 8 elliptic to oblong-elliptic leaves measuring 7–14 centimetres (2.8–5.5 in) long and 2–4 centimetres (0.79–1.57 in) wide, with its upper surface being vividly tessellated dark and pale green, while its underside is sometimes of suffused purple. The green-purple, pubescent inflorescence of 20–55 centimetres (7.9–21.7 in) in height contains a single flower that blooms up to 10 centimetres (3.9 in). The Sulawesi variant is differentiated P. bullenianum proper by its shorter petals with fewer spots and a shorter lip.

== Distribution ==
P. bullenianum proper is distributed throughout the equatorial part of Malesia, stretching from central Sumatra to the equatorial part of Borneo, where it grows from sea level to 1,850 metres (6,070 ft) of elevation, but typically available in elevations of around 900 metres (3,000 ft), with mean temperature range of 20–22 °C (68–72 °F). The Sulawesi variant is available throughout Sulawesi, together with Seram Island eastward in Maluku, in elevations around 950 metres (3,120 ft).
