= Mount Victoria (Palawan) =

Mountain in central Palawan, Philippijes

- Victoria Peaks
- Location within Philippines

Highest point
- Elevation: 1,726 m (5,663 ft)
- Prominence: 1,619 m (5,312 ft)
- Listing: Mountains in the PhilippinesUltra
- Coordinates: 09°21′54″N 118°20′03″E

Geography
- Location: Palawan
- Country: Philippines
- Region: Mimaropa
- Province: Palawan
- Municipality: Narra

Mount Victoria (1726 or 1709 m ), or Victoria Peaks, is a mountain in central Palawan, Philippines, that lies within the administrative Municipality of Narra. The mountain, which includes the twin peaks known as "The Teeth", as well as the single prominence known as Sagpaw, form the largest contiguous land area and second highest portion of the Mount Beaufort Ultramafics geological region, a series of ultramafic outcrops of Eocene origin, that includes Palawan's highest peak, Mount Mantalingahan (2085 m).

Mount Victoria is not generally accessible to the public without special permission owing to the difficulty of ascent; there is no route to the summit, and as such, it is necessary to ascend the mountain by walking up river-beds prone to flash flooding. Attempts to reach the peak have resulted in a number of deaths.

A carnivorous pitcher plant, Nepenthes attenboroughii, is endemic to the summit region of Mount Victoria and its surrounding peaks.

== See also ==
- List of ultras of the Philippines
