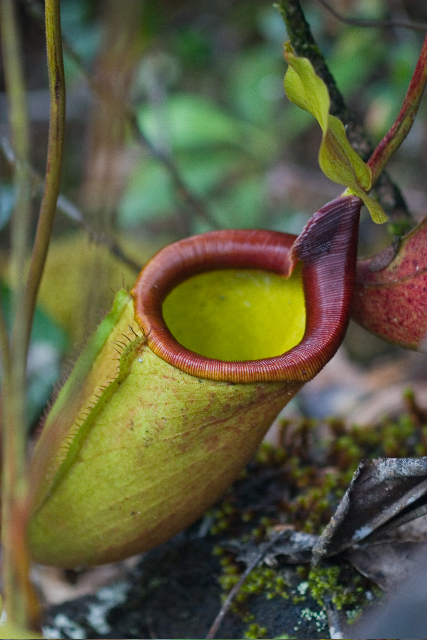
- A lower pitcher of Nepenthes deaniana. Thumb Peak (Mount Pulgar), Palawan.

Conservation status
- Near Threatened (IUCN 3.1)

Scientific classification
- Kingdom: Plantae
- Clade: Tracheophytes
- Clade: Angiosperms
- Clade: Eudicots
- Order: Caryophyllales
- Family: Nepenthaceae
- Genus: Nepenthes
- Species: N. deaniana

Binomial name
- Nepenthes deaniana Macfarl. (1908)

= Nepenthes deaniana =

Species of pitcher plant from the Philippines

Nepenthes deaniana (/nɪˈpɛnθiːz ˌdiːniˈɑːnə/; after Dean C. Worcester) is a tropical pitcher plant endemic to the Philippines, where it grows at an altitude of 1,180–1,296 m above sea level. The species is known only from the summit region of Thumb Peak, a relatively small, ultramafic mountain in Puerto Princesa Province, Palawan.

Nepenthes deaniana has no known natural hybrids. No forms or varieties have been described.

In his Carnivorous Plant Database, taxonomist Jan Schlauer treats N. gantungensis, N. leonardoi and N. mira as heterotypic synonyms of N. deaniana.

Adolph Daniel Edward Elmer recorded a plant from Mount Pulgar (now known as Thumb Peak) matching the description of N. deaniana. He made mention of this discovery in the April 20, 1912 issue of Leaflets of Philippine Botany, in his formal description of N. graciliflora:

Recently the writer [Elmer] observed a large sterile species on mount Pulgar of Palawan. Some of its pitchers were a foot long and six inches thick!
