= Alastair Robinson =

Botanist and botanical illustrator

- Born: 1980 (age 45–46)
- Education: University College London, Queens' College, University of Cambridge
- Scientific career
- Fields: Carnivorous plants, Nepenthes, Drosera
- Workplaces: National Herbarium of Victoria, Royal Botanic Gardens Victoria
- Thesis: Mutational Analysis of Cyclin D3;1 in Arabidopsis (2005)
- Author abbrev. (botany): A.S.Rob.

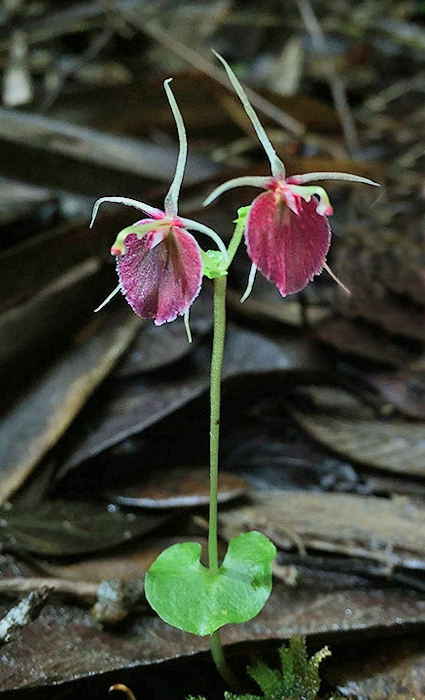
Stigmatodactylus dalagangpalawanicum A.S.Rob.

Alastair S. Robinson (born 1980) is a taxonomist and field botanist specialising in the carnivorous plant genus Nepenthes, for which he is regarded as a world authority. He is currently Manager Biodiversity Services at the National Herbarium of Victoria, Royal Botanic Gardens Melbourne, where he oversees identification and field botany services, the Victorian Conservation Seedbank, the Library and Artwork components of the State Botanical Collection, and the botanical journal Muelleria, a peer-reviewed scientific journal on botany published by the Royal Botanic Gardens Victoria, for which he is Editor in Chief.

Robinson explaining a digested terrestrial shrew consumed by a N. attenboroughii, the giant pitcher plant he co-discovered with S.McPherson & V.B.Heinrich in 2009.

In 2007, Robinson co-discovered the giant Palawan pitcher plant, Nepenthes attenboroughii, for which he published the formal description and diagnosis in 2009, speculating on the paleogeographical evidence for the radiative speciation of an enigmatic group of ultramafic Philippine and Malaysian Nepenthes from a common ancestor on the island of Borneo. Nepenthes attenboroughii was the largest pitcher Nepenthes discovered since the identification of Nepenthes rajah on Borneo in 1858. Other discoveries resulting from his work in Palawan include a first record of the orchid genus Stigmatodactylus in the Philippines, with two new species, Stigmatodactylus aquamarinus A.S.Rob. & E.Gironella and Stigmatodactylus dalagangpalawanicum A.S.Rob., described from Palawan in 2016.

A slipper orchid endemic to Sulawesi, Indonesia, was commemoratively named Paphiopedilum robinsonianum after this authority following its discovery in 2013.

Robinson received his BSc from University College London and his PhD from the University of Cambridge for research into the molecular control mechanisms of spatio-temporal cell-development in plants. Specialisms also include stapeliads (Apocynaceae), terrestrial orchids, ecology and conservation biology.

Works of interest include a 3-volume flora of the genus Drosera (2017), a 2-volume flora of the genus Pinguicula (2016), a 2-volume flora of Nepenthes, titled Pitcher Plants of the Old World (2009), for which he co-authored the species descriptions, and a range of Nepenthes field guides.

Robinson is brother to screen actress Zuleikha Robinson.

== Standard author abbreviation ==
The standard author abbreviation A.S.Rob. is used to indicate this person as the author when citing a botanical name.

== Selected published taxa ==
- Nepenthes attenboroughii A.S.Rob., S.McPherson & V.B.Heinrich
- Nepenthes pongoides Damit, Yusof, Jumian & A.S.Rob.
- Stigmatodactylus dalagangpalawanicum A.S.Rob.
- Australian Plant Name Index
- International Plant Names Index

See also Category:Taxa named by Alastair Robinson

== Publications ==
- Damit, A., Yusof, N.A.M., Jumian, J., Clarke, C. and Robinson, A.S. (2024). Sabah’s hidden giant: Nepenthes pongoides (Nepenthaceae), a micro-endemic tropical pitcher plant from northern Borneo. Australian Journal of Botany, 72(8). doi:10.1071/BT24050
- Wyse Jackson P., Sutherland L.A, Robinson A. (2024). Role of Botanic Gardens. In: (Scheiner, S.M. ed.) Encyclopedia of Biodiversity (Third Edition), Elsevier, Academic Press, pp. 485–505. doi:10.1016/B978-0-12-822562-2.00324-8
- Tamayo, M., Marcos-Langbao, A., Bustamante, R.A., Ang, Y.P., Schubert, D., Mustaqim, W., Fritsch, P. and Robinson, A. (2023). Rhododendron astrophorum (Ericaceae, Rhododendron sect. Schistanthe), a new micro-endemic species from central Palawan, Philippines. Edinburgh Journal of Botany, 80. doi:10.24823/ejb.2023.1979
- Amor, M.D., Barmos, S., Cameron, H.E., Hartnett, C., Hodgens, N., Jamieson, L., May, T.W., McMullan-Fisher, S., Robinson, A. & Rutter, N.J. (2023). On the trail of a critically endangered fungus: a world-first application of wildlife detection dogs to fungal conservation. iScience. doi:10.1016/j.isci.2024.109729
- Lim, G., Golos, M.R., Mey, F.S., Wistuba, A., McPherson, S.R., and Robinson, A.S. 2023. Delimitation of the Nepenthes macfarlanei group with two species described as new. In: McPherson, S.R. Nepenthes: The Tropical Pitcher Plants, vol. 3. Redfern Natural History Productions, Poole, pp. 2084–2195.
- Tan, H.L., Lim, G., Mey, F.S., Golos, M.R., Wistuba, A., McPherson, S.R. and Robinson, A.S. 2023. Nepenthes berbulu (Nepenthaceae), a pitcher plant from Peninsular Malaysia with remarkably long lid bristles. Carnivorous Plant Newsletter: 52(1): 15–43. doi:10.55360/cpn521.fm322
- Krueger, T., Robinson, A.S., Bourke, G. and Fleischmann, A. 2023. Small leaves, big diversity: Citizen science and taxonomic revision triples species number in the carnivorous Drosera microphylla complex (D. section Ergaleium, Droseraceae). Biology, 12(1), p. 141. doi:10.3390/biology12010141
- Cross, A.T., van der Ent, A., Wickmann, M., Skates, L.M., Sumail, S., Gebauer, G. and Robinson, A.S. 2022. Capture of mammal excreta by Nepenthes is an effective heterotrophic nutrition strategy. Annals of Botany, 130(7), pp. 927–938. doi:10.1093/aob/mcac134
- Angeles, M.D.D., Buot Jr, I.E., Moran, C.B., Robinson, A.S. and Tandang, D.N., 2022. Corybas kaiganganianus (Orchidaceae), a new, rare helmet orchid from Samar Island, Philippines. Phytotaxa, 543(2), pp. 127–134. doi:10.11646/phytotaxa.543.2.3
- Robinson, A.S (2021). 1008. Stigmatodactylus dalagangpalawanicum: Orchidaceae. Curtis's Botanical Magazine, 38(4), pp. 537–547. doi:10.1111/curt.12418
- Tandang, D.N., Galindon, J.M.M., Lagunday, N.E., Coritico, F.P., Amoroso, V.B. and Robinson, A.S. (2021). Amylotheca cleofei sp. nov.(Loranthaceae), a new species and genus record for the Philippines. Phytotaxa, 507(1), pp. 113–120. doi:10.11646/phytotaxa.507.1.7
- Rule, M.G.Q., Ang, Y.P., Rubite, R.R., Docot, R.V.A., Bustamante, R.A.A. & Robinson, A.S. (2020). Begonia makuruyot (Begoniaceae, section Baryandra), a new species from Surigao del Norte Province, Philippines. Phytotaxa, 470(3): 226–234. doi:10.11646/phytotaxa.470.3.2
- Cross, A.T., Krueger, T.A., Gonella, P.M., Robinson, A.S., & Fleischmann, A.S. (2020). Conservation of carnivorous plants in the age of extinction. Global Ecology and Conservation, e01272. doi:10.1016/j.gecco.2020.e01272
- Bianchi, A., Lee, C.C., Golos, M.R., Mey, F.S., Mansur, M., Mambrasar, Y.M. & Robinson, A.S. (2020). Nepenthes diabolica (Nepenthaceae), a new species of toothed pitcher plant from Central Sulawesi. Phytotaxa, 464(1): 29–48. doi:10.11646/phytotaxa.464.1.2
- Tandang, D.N., Bustamante, R.A.A., Ferreras, U., Hadsall, A.S., Pimm-Lyon, S. & Robinson, A.S. (2020). Corybas circinatus (Orchidaceae), a new species from Palawan, the Philippines. Phytotaxa, 446(2), 135–140. doi:10.11646/phytotaxa.446.2.7 doi:10.11646/phytotaxa.446.2.7
- Golos, M., Robinson, A.S., Barer, M., Dancak, M., de Witte, J., Limberg, A., Sapawi, N., & Tjiasmanto, W. (2020). Nepenthes fractiflexa (Nepenthaceae), a new Bornean pitcher plant exhibiting concaulescent metatopy and a high degree of axillary bud activation. Phytotaxa, 432(2), 125–143. doi:10.11646/phytotaxa.432.2.3
- Robinson, A.S. (2019). Pygmy sundews - dwarf stars of the genus Drosera. Australian Plants 29, 356–360.
- Robinson, A.S., Zamudio, S.G. and Caballero, R.B. (2019). Nepenthes erucoides (Nepenthaceae), an ultramaficolous micro-endemic from Dinagat Islands Province, northern Mindanao, Philippines. Phytotaxa 423 (1), 21–32. doi:10.11646/phytotaxa.423.1.3
- Robinson, A.S., Golos, M.R., Barer, M., Sano, Y., Forgie, J.J., Garrido, D., Gorman, C.N., Luick, A.O., McIntosh, N.W., McPherson, S.R., Palena, G.J., Panco, I., Quinn, B.R., and Shea, J. (2019). Revisions in Nepenthes following explorations of the Kemul Massif and the surrounding region in north-central Kalimantan, Borneo. Phytotaxa, 392(2), 97–126. doi:10.11646/phytotaxa.392.2.1
- Robinson A.S., Cross A.T., Meisterl M.E. & Fleischmann A., 2018. A new pygmy sundew, Drosera albonotata (Droseraceae), from the western Wheatbelt and an updated diagnostic key to the orange-flowered pygmy Drosera of Western Australia. Phytotaxa, 346(3), pp. 221–236. doi:10.11646/phytotaxa.346.3.2
- Clarke, C., Schlauer, J., Moran, J. & Robinson, A.S., 2018. Systematics and evolution of Nepenthes. In: Ellison, A.M. & Adamec, L., eds.: Carnivorous plants: physiology, ecology, and evolution. Oxford University Press, 58–69. doi:10.1093/oso/9780198779841.003.0005
- Robinson A.S. (2017). Drosera banksii R.Br. ex DC. Philippines Distribution Extension. In: Robinson A.S., Gibson R., Gonella P., McPherson S.R., Nunn R. & Fleischmann A.: Drosera of the World. Vol. 3 - Latin America & Africa. Redfern Natural History, UK, pp 1540–1541.
- Lowrie A., Nunn R., Robinson A.S., Bourke G., McPherson S. & Fleischmann A. (2017). Drosera of the World. Vol. 1, Oceania. Redfern Natural History, Dorset. 536 pp.
- Lowrie A., Robinson A.S., Nunn R., Rice B., Bourke G., Gibson R., McPherson S. & Fleischmann A. (2017). Drosera of the World. Vol. 2, Oceania, Asia, Europe, North America. Redfern Natural History, Dorset. 554 pp.
- Robinson A.S., Gibson R., Gonella P., McPherson S., Nunn R. & Fleischmann A. (2017). Drosera of the World. Vol. 3, Latin America & Africa. Redfern Natural History, Dorset. 476 pp.
- Robinson A.S., Gironella E., & Cervancia J. (2016). New orchid species of Stigmatodactylus (Orchidoideae; Diurideae) and a new record of Cryptostylis carinata from central Palawan, Philippines. Phytotaxa, 252(2), 99–113. doi:10.11646/phytotaxa.252.2.2
- Roccia A., Gluch O., Lampard S., Robinson A.S., Fleischmann A., McPherson S., Legendre L., Partrat E., Temple P. (2016). Pinguicula of the Temperate North. Redfern Natural History, UK, 349 pp.
- Lampard S., Gluch O., Robinson A.S., Fleischmann A., Temple P., McPherson S., Roccia A., Partrat E., Legendre L. (2016). Pinguicula of Latin America. Redfern Natural History, UK, 362 pp.
- Lowrie, A. 2014. (editor, contributor) Carnivorous Plants of Australia Magnum Opus Volume 1. Redfern Natural History Productions, UK.
- McPherson, S., A.S. Robinson, 2012. Field Guide to the Pitcher Plants of Australia and New Guinea. Redfern Natural History Productions, UK.
- McPherson, S., A.S. Robinson, 2012. Field Guide to the Pitcher Plants of Peninsular Malaysia and Indochina. Redfern Natural History Productions, UK.
- McPherson, S., A.S. Robinson, 2012. Field Guide to the Pitcher Plants of Sumatra and Java. Redfern Natural History Productions, UK.
- McPherson, S., A.S. Robinson, 2012. Field Guide to the Pitcher Plants of Borneo. Redfern Natural History Productions, UK.
- McPherson, S., A.S. Robinson, 2012. Field Guide to the Pitcher Plants of Sulawesi. Redfern Natural History Productions, UK.
- Robinson, A.S., J. Nerz, A. Wistuba, M. Mansur & S. McPherson, 2011. Nepenthes lamii Jebb & Cheek, an emended description resulting from the separation of a two-species complex, and the introduction of Nepenthes monticola, a new species of highland Nepenthes from New Guinea. In: S.R. McPherson New Nepenthes: Volume One. Redfern Natural History Productions, Poole. pp. 477–512.
- Robinson, A.S., J. Nerz, & A. Wistuba, 2011. Nepenthes epiphytica, a new Pitcher Plant from East Kalimantan. In: S.R. McPherson New Nepenthes: Volume One. Redfern Natural History Productions, Poole. pp. 316–331.
- Mey, F.S., L.H. Truong, D.V. Dai & A.S. Robinson, 2011. Nepenthes thorelii, an emended description and novel ecological data resulting from its rediscovery in Tay Ninh, Vietnam. In: S.R. McPherson New Nepenthes: Volume One. Redfern Natural History Productions, Poole. pp. 437–465.
- McPherson, S., G. Bourke, J. Cervancia, M. Jaunzems, E. Gironella, A. Robinson & A. Fleischmann 2011. Nepenthes leonardoi (Nepenthaceae), a new pitcher plant species from Palawan, Philippines. Carniflora Australis 8(1): 4–19.
- Fleischmann, A., A.S. Robinson, S. McPherson, V. Heinrich, E. Gironella & D.A. Madulid 2011. "Drosera ultramafica (Droseraceae), a new sundew species of the ultramafic flora of the Malesian highlands" (PDF). Blumea 56(1): 10–15.
- McPherson, S.R., Fleischmann, A.S., Robinson, A.S., 2010. Carnivorous Plants and their Habitats Volume 1. Redfern Natural History Productions, UK, 723 pages.
- McPherson, S.R., Fleischmann, A.S., Robinson, A.S., 2010. Carnivorous Plants and their Habitats Volume 2. Redfern Natural History Productions, UK, 719 pages.
- Mey, F.S., M. Catalano, C. Clarke, A. Robinson, A. Fleischmann & S. McPherson 2010. "Nepenthes holdenii (Nepenthaceae), a new species of pyrophytic pitcher plant from the Cardamom Mountains of Cambodia" (PDF). In: S.R. McPherson Carnivorous Plants and their Habitats. Volume 2. Redfern Natural History Productions, Poole. pp. 1306–1331.
- McPherson, S., J. Cervancia, C. Lee, M. Jaunzems, A. Fleischmann, F. Mey, E. Gironella & A. Robinson, 2010. Nepenthes palawanensis (Nepenthaceae), a new pitcher plant species from Sultan Peak, Palawan Island, Philippines. In: S.R. McPherson Carnivorous Plants and their Habitats. Redfern Natural History Productions Ltd., Poole. pp. 1332–1339.
- McPherson, S., J. Cervancia, C. Lee, M. Jaunzems, A. Fleischmann, F. Mey, E. Gironella & A. Robinson, 2010. Nepenthes gantungensis (Nepenthaceae), a new pitcher plant species from Mount Gantung, Palawan, Philippines. In: S.R. McPherson Carnivorous Plants and their Habitats. Redfern Natural History Productions Ltd., Poole. pp. 1286–1295.
- Robinson, AS, et al., 2009. A spectacular new species of Nepenthes L. (Nepenthaceae) pitcher plant from central Palawan, Philippines. Bot. J. Linn. Soc. 159(2): 195–202.
- McPherson, SR, Robinson, AS, Fleischmann, AS, 2009. Pitcher Plants of the Old World Volume 1. Redfern Natural History Productions, UK, 630 pages.
- McPherson, SR, Robinson, AS, Fleischmann, AS, 2009. Pitcher Plants of the Old World Volume 2. Redfern Natural History Productions, UK, 766 pages.
- de Jager, SM, Scofield, S, Huntley, RP, Robinson, AS, et al., 2009. Dissecting regulatory pathways of G1/S control in Arabidopsis: common and distinct targets of CYCD3;1, E2Fa and E2Fc. Plant Molecular Biology. 71(4–5): 345–365.
- Robinson, A. 1997. Malaysia Trip 1996. The Carnivorous Plant Society Journal 20: 6–17.
- Robinson, A. 1995 ['1994/95']. Plant findings in Malaysia. The Carnivorous Plant Society Journal 18: 44–47.
