= Stewart McPherson (geographer) =

British geographer (born 1983)

- Born: Stewart Robin McPherson; January 1, 1983 (age 43)
- Education: University of Durham
- Occupations: Geographer, field biologist, nature photographer, writer
- Awards: David Given Award for Excellence in Plant Conservation (2012)
- Website: www.redfernnaturalhistory.com

Stewart Robin McPherson is a British geographer, field biologist, nature photographer, and writer.

== Background ==
Born 1 January 1983, McPherson graduated in geography at the University of Durham in England, and studied briefly at the University of Tübingen in Germany, and Yale University in the United States. On graduation in 2006 he founded Redfern Natural History Productions in Poole, Dorset to conduct natural history research, publishing, filming and eco-tours.

== Career ==
=== Work in natural history ===
Stewart McPherson is the author of around 30 volumes published by his own company and concerned with natural history, largely focusing on carnivorous plants. He has co-discovered a number of species (including the much publicised Nepenthes attenboroughii) and has formally described around 35 carnivorous plant taxa.

He has a wife named Karen Battat and two children, Louis (12) and Jasmine (9). He is a member of the IUCN SSC Carnivorous Plant Specialist Group. He documented each species in full detail in its natural habitat, taking seven years with many expeditions in the tropics of Southeast Asia, Africa and South America. Over time he has transitioned towards TV presenting and natural history writing.

He set up "Ark of Life" to conserve species on the brink of extinction, initially among carnivorous plant groups.

=== Television presenting ===
McPherson has appeared in several documentaries, including a conservation documentary on the lost world tepui sandstone plateaux of southern Venezuela and the borderlands of northern Brazil and western Guyana. A 2011 documentary Mountain with No Name was set on Palawan in the Philippines, where he discovered new species of flesh-eating plants on a previously unexplored mountain. An earlier 2010 film documented the discovery of Nepenthes leonardoi.

His most recent series for the BBC was "Britain's Treasure Islands", a series of three episodes in which he visited all 14 of the British Overseas Territories, travelling 70,000 km (43,000 mi) in the process. Working with cameraman Simon Vacher, he discussed the natural history of each location and history of British settlement. The series was focused on the natural history of the Territories, particular the most impressive wildlife populations and migrations.

In British Antarctica and South Georgia he retraced the expedition of Ernest Shackleton, and made a rare visit to the Chagos Archipelago and Pitcairn Island. The series was filmed in 2012-2014, broadcast on BBC Four in 2016 and repeated in 2018 and 2019.

=== Awards ===
In 2012 McPherson was the first recipient of the David Given Award for Excellence in Plant Conservation.

== Published work ==
- Video channel, Redfern Productions
- McPherson, S.R. 2023. Nepenthes: The Tropical Pitcher Plant Volume 1. Redfern Natural History Productions, Poole.
- McPherson, S.R. 2023. Nepenthes: The Tropical Pitcher Plant Volume 2. Redfern Natural History Productions, Poole.
- McPherson, S.R. 2023. Nepenthes: The Tropical Pitcher Plant Volume 3. Redfern Natural History Productions, Poole.
- 2016. Britain's Treasure Islands: A Journey to the UK Overseas Territories. Redfern Natural History Productions, Poole.
- Tim Bailey and McPherson, S.R. 2013. Dionaea: The Venus's Flytrap. Redfern Natural History Productions, Poole.
- McPherson, S.R. and Donald Schnell. 2013. Field Guide to the Carnivorous Plants of the United States and Canada. Redfern Natural History Productions, Poole.
- McPherson, S.R. and Alastair Robinson. 2012.Field Guide to the Pitcher Plants of Sulawesi. Redfern Natural History Productions, Poole.
- McPherson, S.R. and Alastair Robinson. 2012. Field Guide to the Pitcher Plants of Borneo. Redfern Natural History Productions, Poole.
- McPherson, S.R. and Alastair Robinson. 2012. Field Guide to the Pitcher Plants of Australia and New Guinea. Redfern Natural History Productions, Poole.
- McPherson, S.R. and Alastair Robinson. 2012. Field Guide to the Pitcher Plants of Peninsular Malaysia and Indochina. Redfern Natural History Productions, Poole.
- McPherson, S.R. and Alastair Robinson. 2012. Field Guide to the Pitcher Plants of Sumatra and Java. Redfern Natural History Productions, Poole.
- McPherson, S.R. and Donald Schnell. 2011. Sarraceniaceae of North America. Redfern Natural History Productions, Poole.
- McPherson, S.R. and Victor B. Amoroso. 2011. Field Guide to the Pitcher Plants of the Philippines. Redfern Natural History Productions, Poole.
- McPherson, S.R. 2011. New Nepenthes: Volume One. Redfern Natural History Productions, Poole.
- McPherson, S., Andreas Wistuba, Andreas Fleischmann, and Joachim Nerz. 2011. Sarraceniaceae of South America. Redfern Natural History Productions, Poole.
- McPherson, S.R., Andreas Fleischmann, Alastair Robinson. 2010. Carnivorous Plants and their Habitats (2 volumes). Redfern Natural History Productions, Poole.
- McPherson, S.R. 2009. Pitcher Plants of the Old World. Redfern Natural History Productions, Poole. (2 volumes)
- McPherson, S. 2008. Lost Worlds of the Guiana Highlands. Redfern Natural History Productions, Poole.
- McPherson, S.R. 2008. Glistening Carnivores - The Sticky-Leaved Insect-Eating Plants. Redfern Natural History Productions, Poole.
- McPherson, S.R. 2006. Pitcher Plants of the Americas. McDonald and Woodward Publishing Company.
