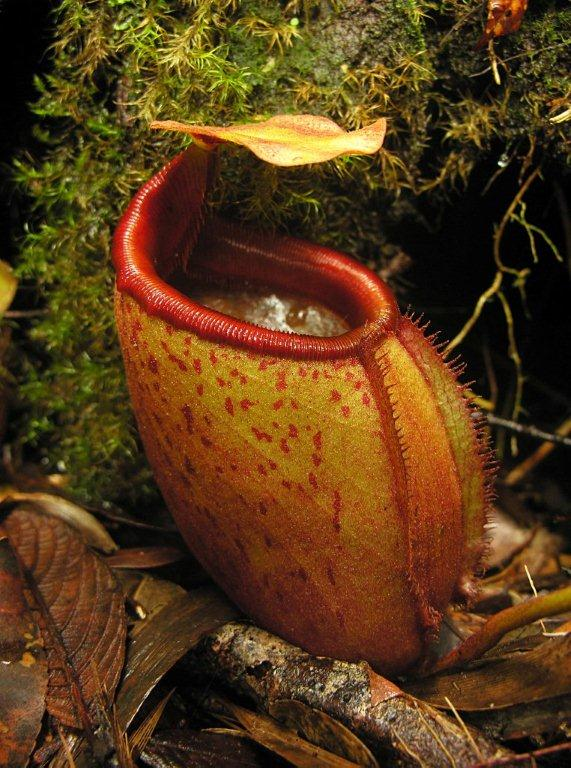
- A rosette pitcher of N. mira growing near the summit of Mount Cleopatra

Conservation status
- Vulnerable (IUCN 3.1)

Scientific classification
- Kingdom: Plantae
- Clade: Embryophytes
- Clade: Tracheophytes
- Clade: Angiosperms
- Clade: Eudicots
- Order: Caryophyllales
- Family: Nepenthaceae
- Genus: Nepenthes
- Species: N. mira

Binomial name
- Nepenthes mira Jebb & Cheek (1998)

= Nepenthes mira =

Tropical pitcher plant endemic to the Philippines

Nepenthes mira (/nɪˈpɛnθiːz ˈmɪərə/; from Latin mirus "wonderful") is a highland pitcher plant endemic to Palawan in the Philippines. It grows at elevations of 1,550–1,605 m above sea level.

Nepenthes mira was formally described by Matthew Jebb and Martin Cheek in 1998. The authors suggest that N. mira is related to the Bornean species N. edwardsiana, N. macrophylla, and N. villosa. In his Carnivorous Plant Database, taxonomist Jan Schlauer treats this species as a heterotypic synonym of N. deaniana.

Nepenthes mira has no known natural hybrids. No forms or varieties have been described.
