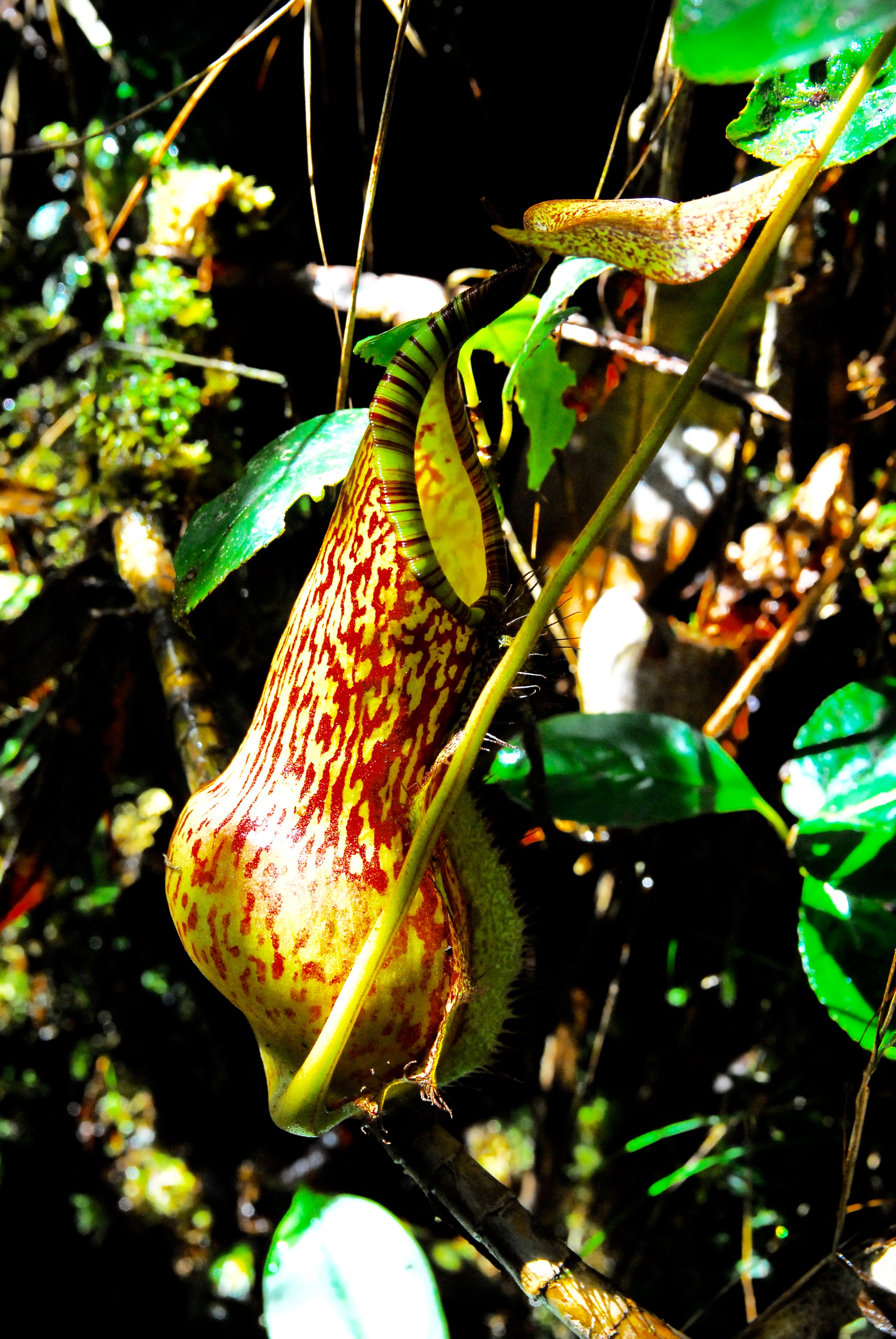

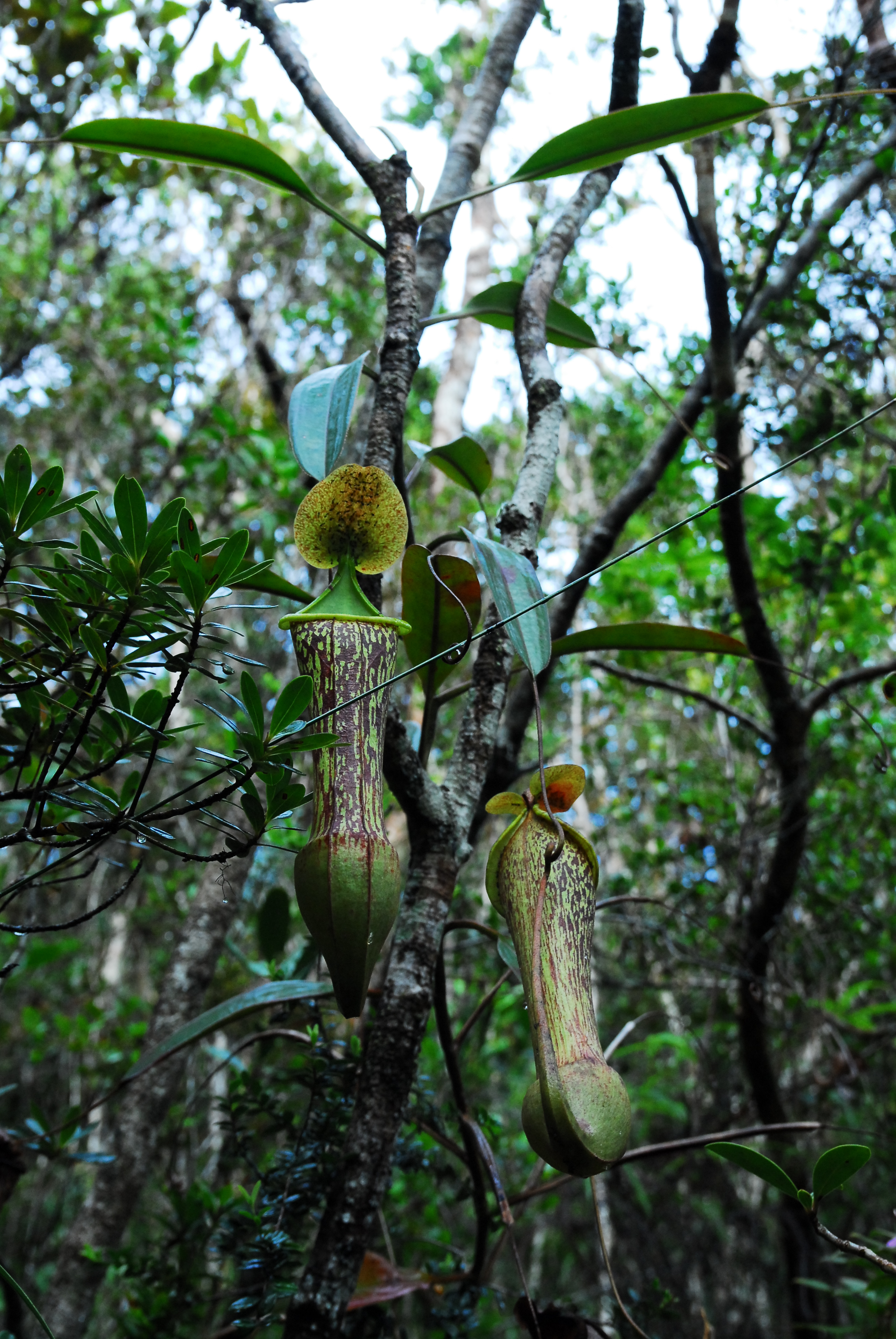
- Lower (top) and upper pitchers from Mount Hamiguitan, Mindanao

Scientific classification
- Kingdom: Plantae
- Clade: Tracheophytes
- Clade: Angiosperms
- Clade: Eudicots
- Order: Caryophyllales
- Family: Nepenthaceae
- Genus: Nepenthes
- Species: N. justinae

Binomial name
- Nepenthes justinae Gronem., Wistuba, Mey & V.B.Amoroso (2016)

= Nepenthes justinae =

Species of pitcher plant from the Philippines

Nepenthes justinae is a tropical pitcher plant known only from Mount Hamiguitan on the Philippine island of Mindanao, where it grows at elevations of 1,000–1,620 m above sea level.

The specific epithet justinae honours Justina Yu, the mayor of San Isidro, Davao Oriental, Mindanao, whose efforts helped get the Mount Hamiguitan Range Wildlife Sanctuary inscribed as a UNESCO World Heritage Site in 2014.

Nepenthes justinae has no confirmed natural hybrids, although certain plants from Mount Hamiguitan may represent crosses involving it and N. hamiguitanensis, N. micramphora, and N. peltata, the three species with which it is sympatric.

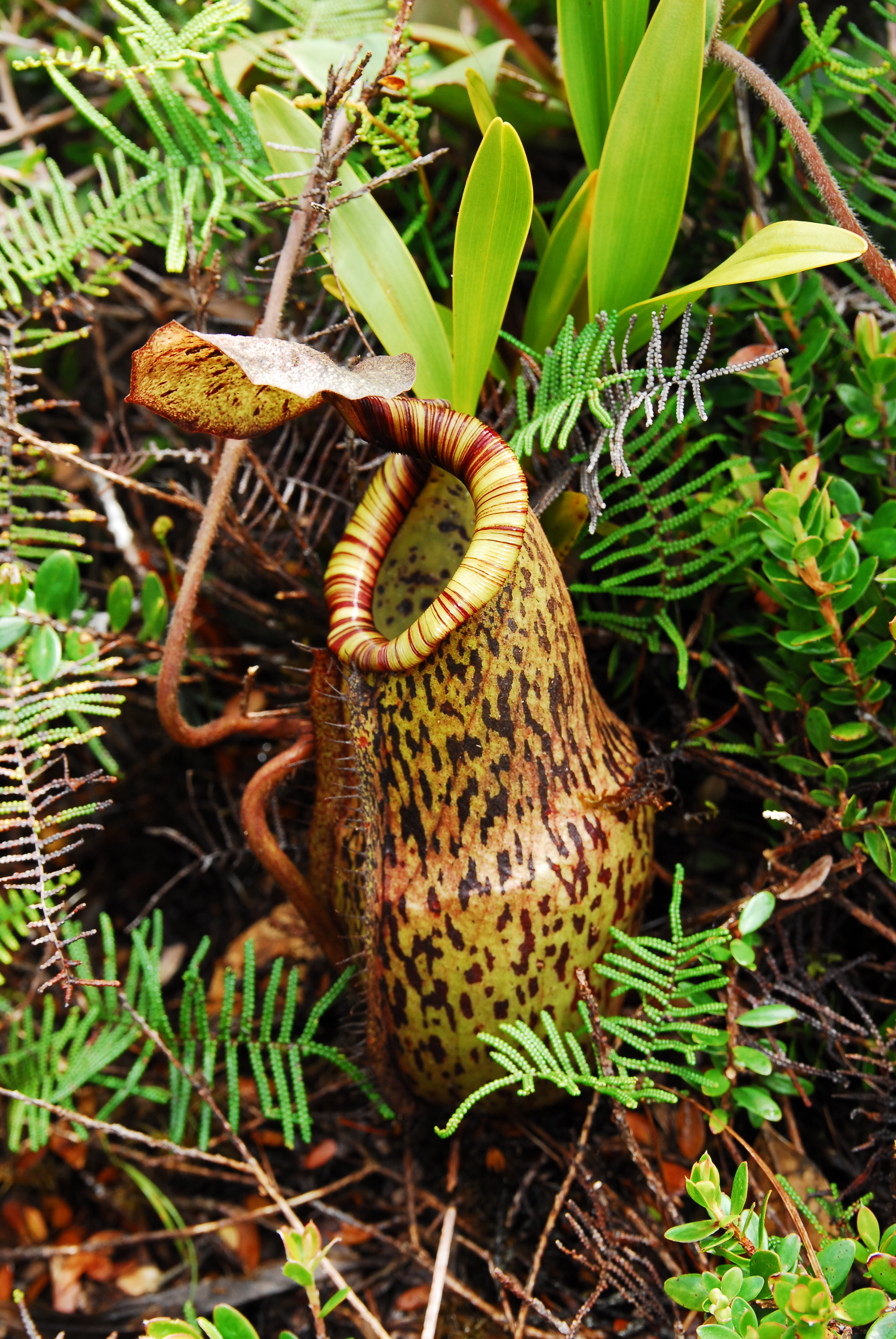
? N. justinae × N. peltata (lower pitcher)

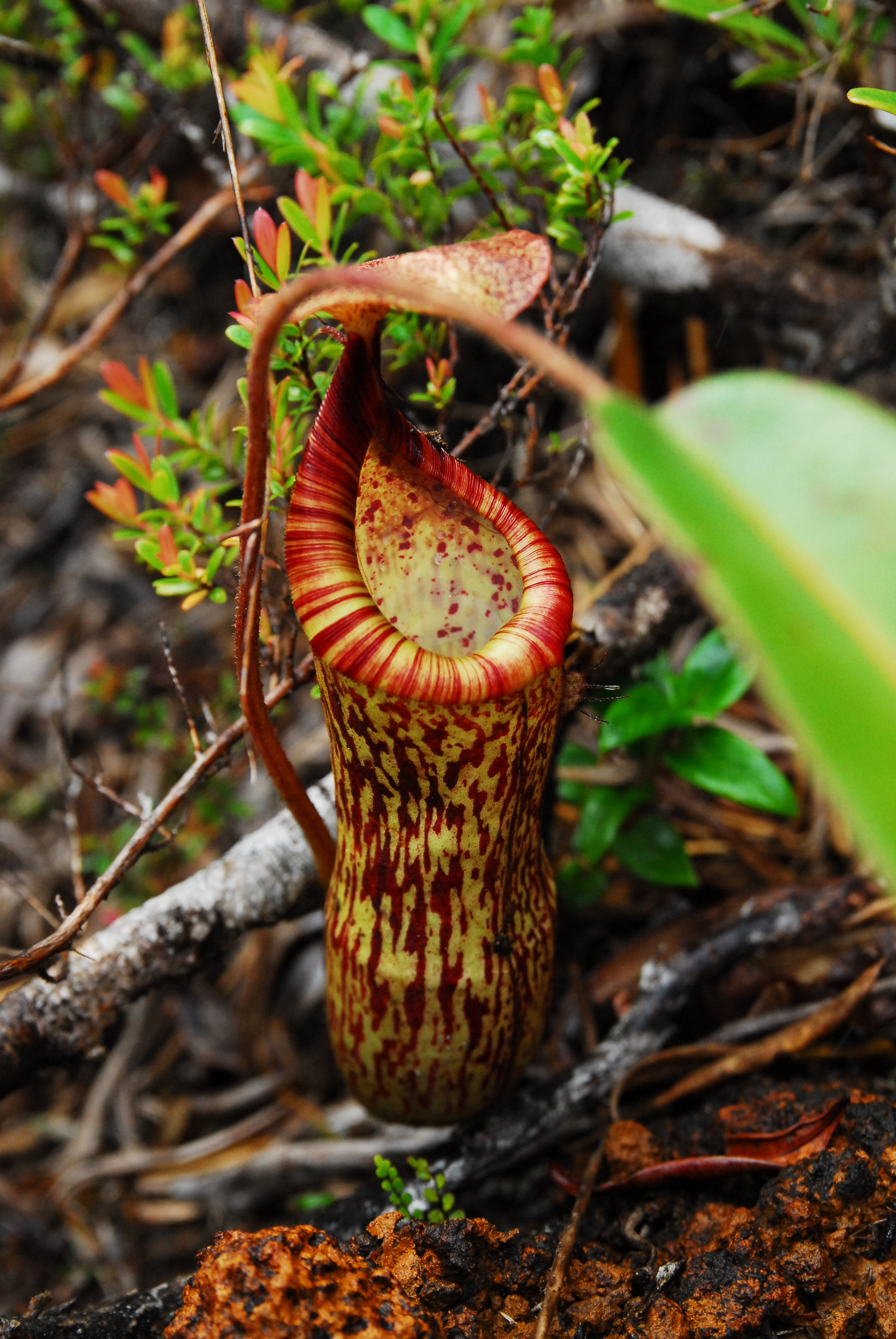
? N. justinae × N. peltata (upper pitcher)
