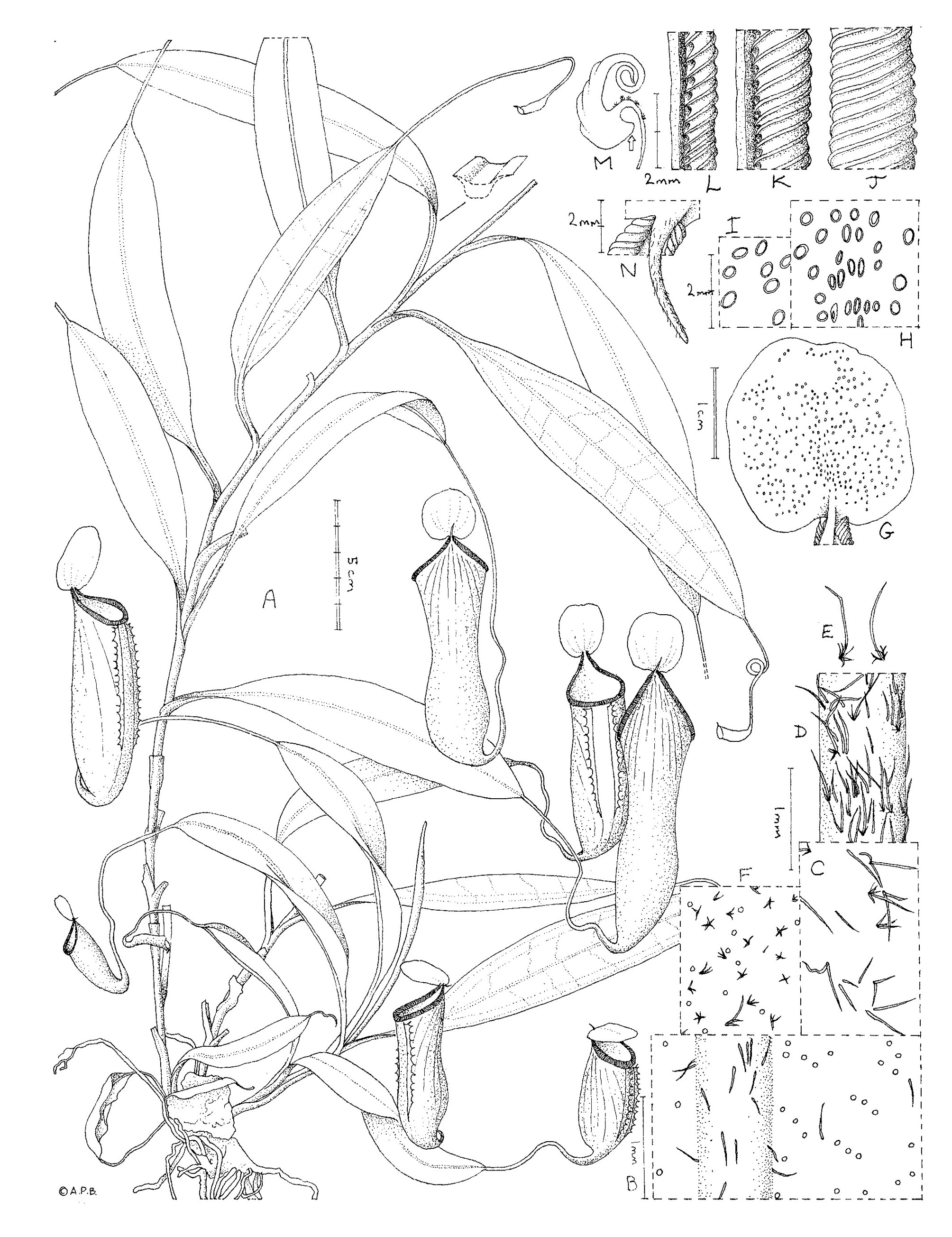
- Botanical illustration of N. cid from Cheek and Jebb's type description

Scientific classification
- Kingdom: Plantae
- Clade: Tracheophytes
- Clade: Angiosperms
- Clade: Eudicots
- Order: Caryophyllales
- Family: Nepenthaceae
- Genus: Nepenthes
- Species: N. cid

Binomial name
- Nepenthes cid Jebb & Cheek (2013)

= Nepenthes cid =

Species of pitcher plant from the Philippines

Nepenthes cid is a tropical pitcher plant native to the Philippines. It is known only from Bukidnon Province, Mindanao, where it has been recorded as an epiphyte on tall trees at 770 m altitude.

This species belongs to the informal "N. micramphora group", which also includes N. abgracilis from northeastern Mindanao and N. micramphora from southeastern Mindanao. N. cid harbors diminutive, subcylindrical pitchers that narrow to the middle and gradually expand towards the base.

The specific epithet cid refers to F. Cid of the University of the Philippines herbarium, who collected the type specimen in 1952.

The authors recommend that this species be assessed as Critically Endangered because the only population is composed of two individuals in a region facing extensive habitat conversion and issues from commercial logging.
