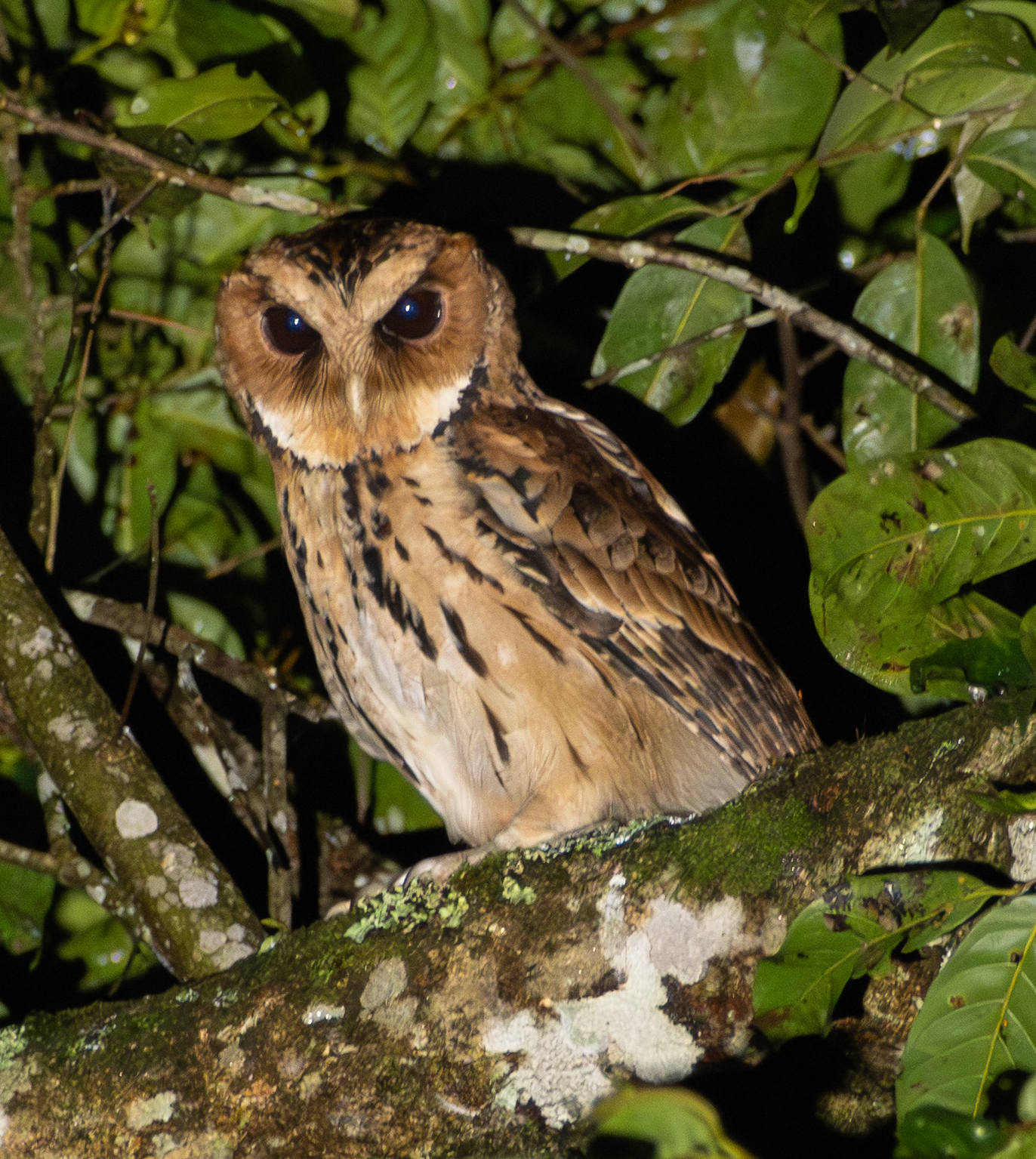

Conservation status
- Vulnerable (IUCN 3.1)
- CITES Appendix I

Scientific classification
- Kingdom: Animalia
- Phylum: Chordata
- Class: Aves
- Order: Strigiformes
- Family: Strigidae
- Genus: Otus
- Species: O. gurneyi

Binomial name
- Otus gurneyi (Tweeddale, 1879)

Synonyms
- Mimizuku gurneyi

= Giant scops owl =

Species of owl

The giant scops owl (Otus gurneyi), lesser eagle owl, Mindanao eagle owl or Mindanao owl, is a species of owl in the family Strigidae. It is endemic to the Philippines, found on Mindanao, the Dinagat Islands, Siargao and Samar. In size and structure, it is considered intermediate between a scops owl and an eagle-owl. Its natural habitat is tropical moist lowland forests. It is threatened by habitat loss.

== Description ==
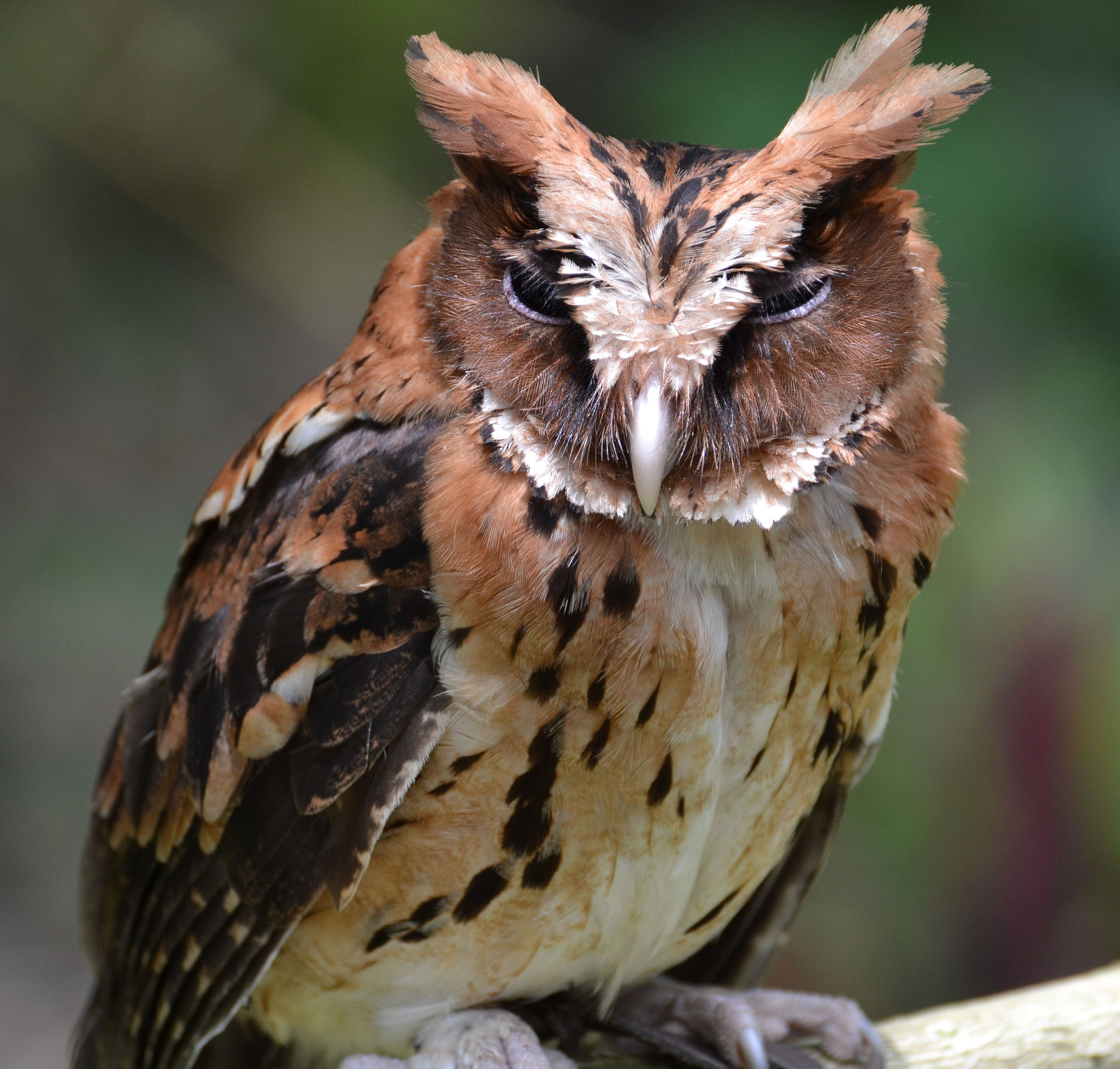

The giant scops owl is a medium-sized bird with a length of about 30 cm (12 in). It has a reddish-brown facial disc with a narrow black edge, white streaks above the eyes and prominent ear tufts. The back of the head and the upperparts of the body are reddish-brown boldly marked with black streaks and with a line of white streaks on the scapulars. The underparts are whitish with traces of reddish-brown and bold black markings. The voice is a series of five to ten calls, "wuaah, wuaah..." with the series repeated at ten to twenty second intervals.

The giant scops owl was originally described as Pseudoptynx gurneyi, and later as Mimizuku gurneyi. it is now part of the genus Otus.

== Ecology and behavior ==
Not much is known about this owl but pressumed to feed on small mammals and birds and large insects.

Birds seem to be most vocally active from February to May. No other information on breeding.

== Distribution and habitat ==
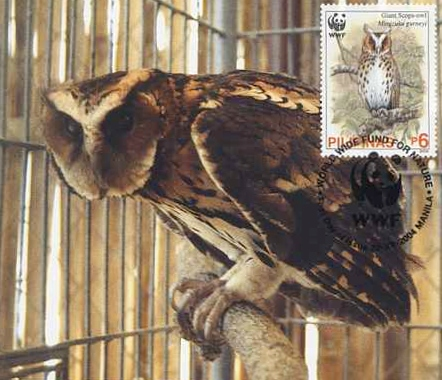
''Otus gurneyi'' on a 2004 stamp and postcard of the Philippines

The giant scops owl was known only from the islands of Dinagat, Siargao and Mindanao. It was only discovered through a hunter in 2010 in Samar. Although it has not yet been proven, it has been theorized that giant scops owls also exist on Marinduque. Its habitat is primary and secondary forests, mostly at an altitude of under 670 m (2,200 ft) although it has been seen up to 1,300 m (4,300 ft). It sometimes frequents partially logged forests of Dipterocarpaceae species.

== Conservation status ==
As of 2025, This species is assessed as Near-threatened species by the International Union for Conservation of Nature. The population is believed to be declining but there are currently no estimates. Prior to 2025, this species was listed Vulnerable species.It is believed that this bird is overlooked and not as endangered as originally thought and that this species can tolerate some habitat degradation. The rate of habitat loss is now much lower and has supposedly slowed down especially in montane habitat.

This species' main threat is habitat loss with wholesale clearance of forest habitats as a result of logging, agricultural conversion and mining activities occurring within the range. Forest cover was estimated at just 29% on Mindanao, and as little as 433 km^{2} of old-growth dipterocarp forest remained on Samar and Leyte (if this species exists there). These figures are continuing to decline due to continued deforestation.

This species is found the protected areas Samar Island Natural Park, Pasonanca Natural Park, Kitanglad Mountain Range, Mount Apo. Mount Malindang and Mount Hamiguitan.
