= Mount Hamiguitan =

Mountain in Davao Oriental, Philippines

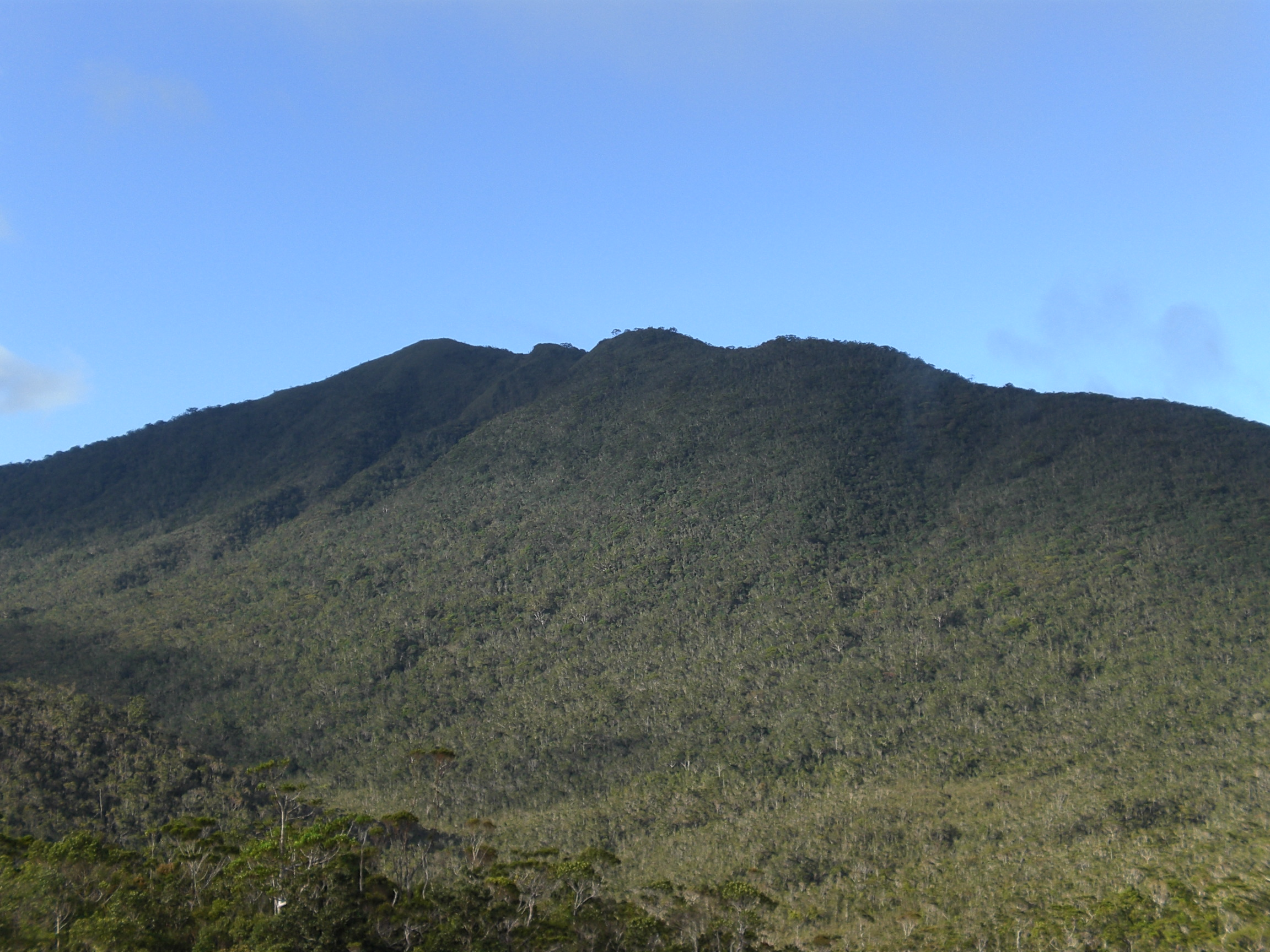

Highest point
- Elevation: 5,315 ft (1,620 m)
- Prominence: 1,497 m (4,911 ft)
- Listing: Ribu
- Coordinates: 6°44′24″N 126°10′54″E

Naming
- Pronunciation: [hamiˈɡitan]

Geography
- Location within Mindanao mainland Location within Philippines
- Country: Philippines
- Region: Davao Region
- Province: Davao Oriental
- City/municipality: Mati; San Isidro; Governor Generoso
- Parent range: Hamiguitan Mountain Range

Geology
- Mountain type: Stratovolcano

UNESCO World Heritage Site
- Official name: Mount Hamiguitan Range Wildlife Sanctuary
- Type: Natural
- Criteria: x
- Designated: 2014 (38th session)
- Reference no.: 1403
- Region: Asia and the Pacific

Mount Hamiguitan is a mountain located in the province of Davao Oriental, Philippines. It has a height of 1,620 metres (5,315 ft). The mountain and its vicinity has one of the most diverse wildlife populations in the country. Among the wildlife found in the area are Philippine eagles and several species of Nepenthes. Some of the latter, such as the Nepenthes peltata and Nepenthes micramphora, are endemic to the area. The mountain has a protected forest area of approximately 2,000 hectares. This woodland is noted for its unique pygmy forest of century-old trees in ultramafic soil, with many endangered, endemic and rare species of flora and fauna.

The Mount Hamiguitan range, with an area of 6,834 hectares (68.34 km^{2}), was declared a national park and a wildlife sanctuary in 2003. In 2014, the park was inscribed as a UNESCO World Heritage Site, becoming the first in Mindanao and the sixth in the Philippines.

Mount Hamiguitan is part of the Eastern Mindanao Biodiversity Corridor. Conservation of the mountain range is a multisectoral effort done involving the provincial government of Davao Oriental, the Department of Environment and Natural Resources, local communities, and indigenous people.

== Geography ==
Mount Hamiguitan is located in the province of Davao Oriental in the southeastern part of the island of Mindanao, Philippines. It occupies the land area within the political boundaries of Mati, San Isidro, and Governor Generoso.

== Flora and fauna ==
=== Plants ===
Inventory of flora species in the mountain and its vicinity showed that its montane forest has the highest species richness of plants with 462 species, followed by its dipterocarp forest with 338 species, mossy forest with 246 species and agro-system with 246 species. The mountain also harbors 45 species of orchids, 23 of which are endemic to the Philippines. Some of the plants commonly found on Mount Hamiguitan include the following:

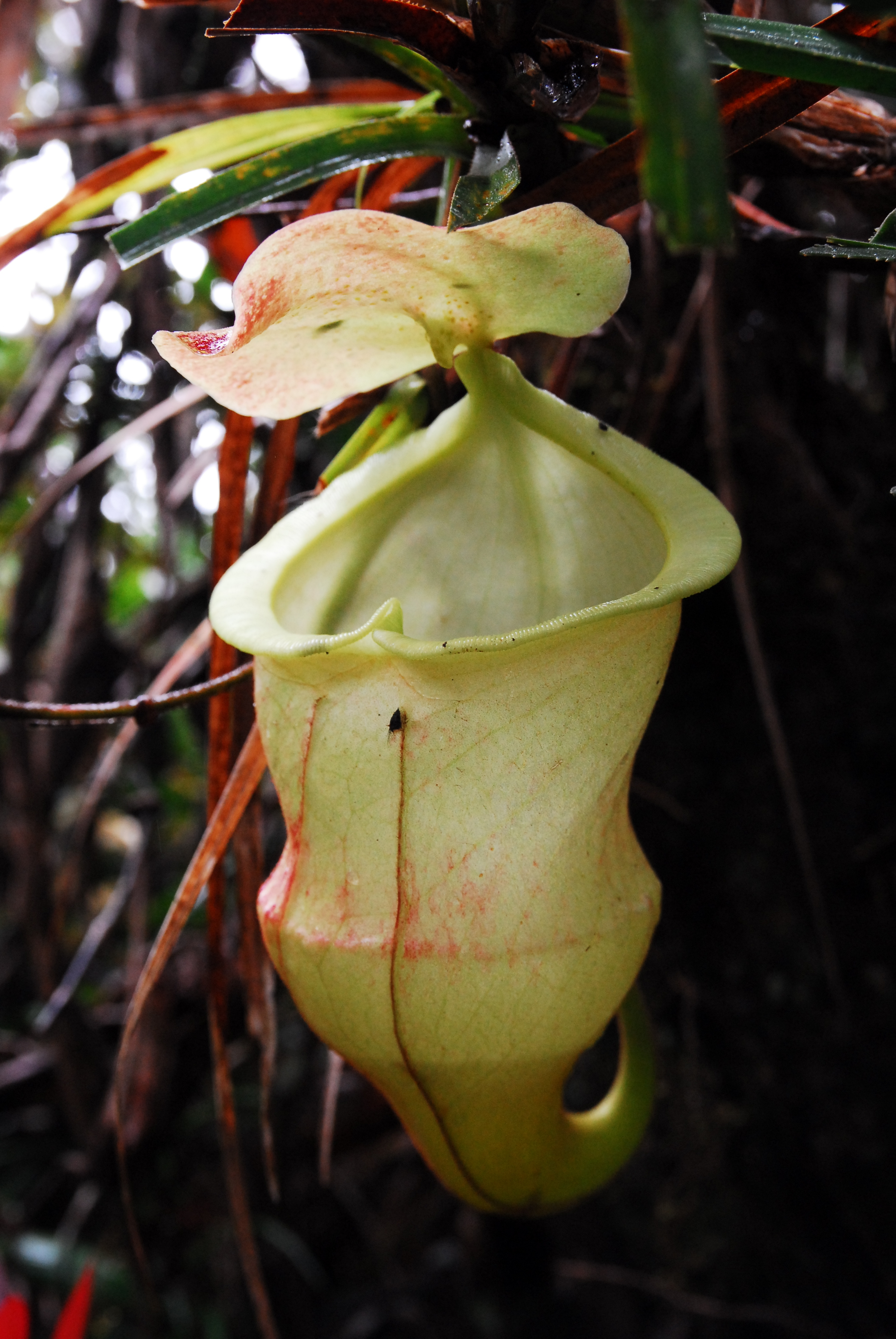
Nepenthes hamiguitanensis

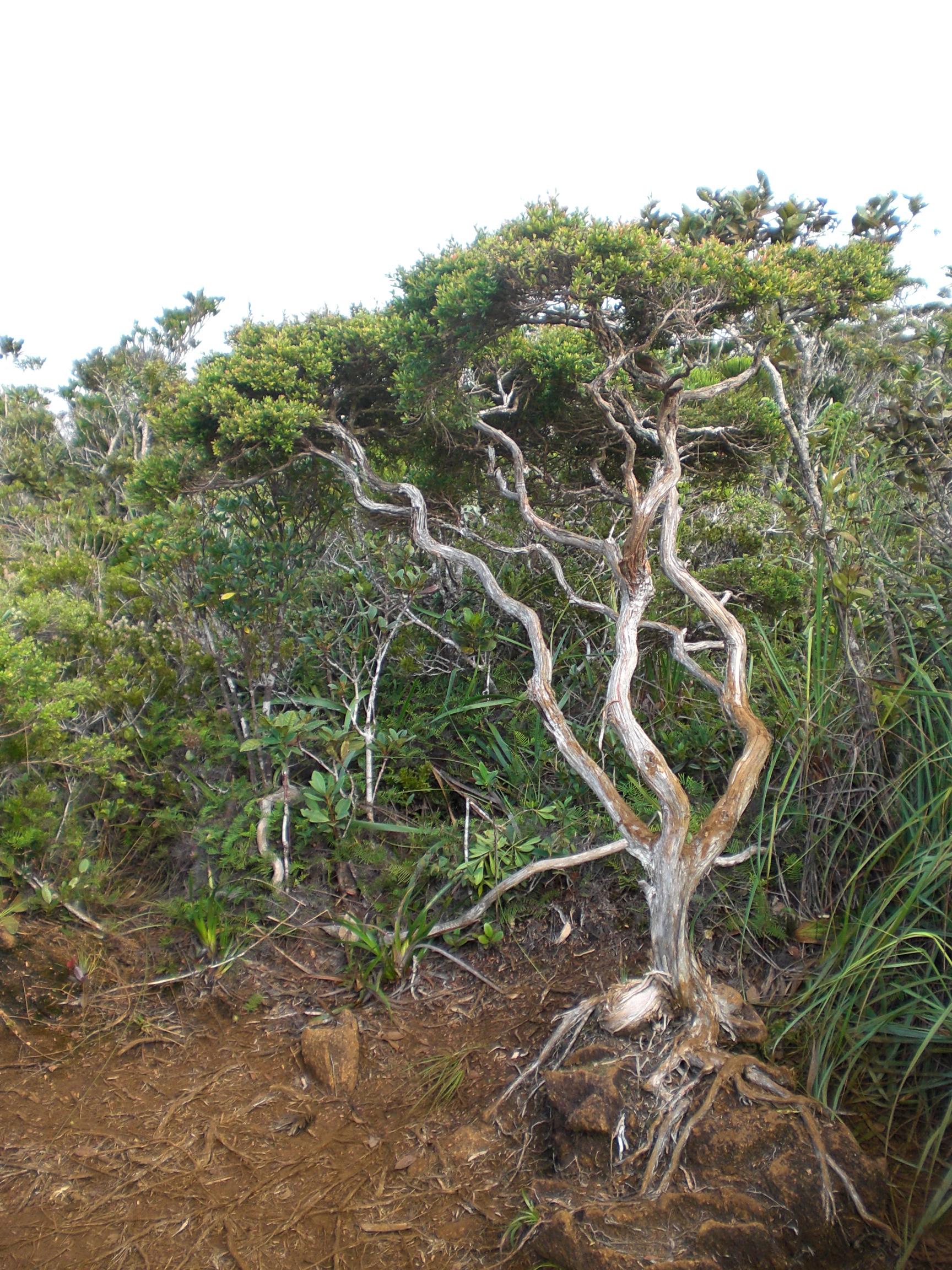
A tree growing in the dwarf forest of Mount Hamiguitan

- Leptospermum flavescens
- Wendlandia nervosa
- Tristaniopsis micrantha
- Dacrydium elatum
- Calophyllum blancoi
- Symplocos polyandra
- Almaciga (Agathis philippinensis)
- Elaeocarpus verticillatus
- Patersonia lowii
- Astronia lagunensis
- Nepenthes alata (sensu lato)
- Nepenthes hamiguitanensis
- Nepenthes justinae
- Nepenthes micramphora
- Nepenthes peltata
- Schizaea inopinata
- Schizaea malaccana
- Paphiopedilum ciliolare
- Dipodium paludosum
- Epigeneium sp.
- Dendrochilum longilabre
- Dendrochilum tenellum
- Dendrochilum sp. (unknown species)
- Macodes petola
- Coelogyne chloroptera
- Bulbophyllum sp.
- Appendicula sp.
- Gleichennia hirta
- Drimys piperita
- Hydnophyton sp.
- Dilochia deleoniae
- Lindsaea hamiguitanensis
- Ceratostylis latipetala
- Bulbophyllum colubrimodum

=== Animals ===
The International Union for Conservation of Nature (IUCN) Red List has identified at least 11 endangered vertebrate species. The Philippine Council for Agriculture, Forestry and Natural Resources and Development (PCARRD) reported that the mountain is inhabited by five endangered species, 27 rare species, 44 endemic species and 59 economically important species. The following species can be found in the area:

- Philippine eagle (Pithecophaga jeffreyi)
- Giant golden-crowned flying fox (Acerodon jubatus)
- Philippine forest roundleaf bat (Hipposideros obscurus)
- Philippine tarsier (Tarsius syrichta)
- Philippine warty pig (Sus philippensis)
- Philippine brown deer (Cervus mariannus)
- Fischer's pygmy fruit bat (Haplonycteris fischeri)
- Asian palm civet (Paradoxurus hermaphroditus)
- Tawitawi brown-dove (Phapitreron cinereiceps)
- Tarictic hornbill (Penelopides panini)
- Grey-hooded sunbird (Aethopyga primigenius)
- Giant scops-owl or Mindanao eagle-owl (Mimizuku gurneyi)
- Batomys hamiguitan (a yellow-brown furry-tailed rat species endemic to the area)

== Designations ==
In 2004, Mount Hamiguitan was declared as a wildlife sanctuary through the Mount Hamiguitan Law which was enacted by President Gloria Macapagal-Arroyo under the initiative of senator Loren Legarda.

In June 2014, the Mount Hamiguitan Range Wildlife Sanctuary was added to the UNESCO list of World Heritage Sites. Prior to this, the site has already been declared an ASEAN Heritage Park.
