= An account of Nepenthes in New Guinea =

1991 article by Matthew Jebb

Front cover of the March 1991 issue of Science in New Guinea

"An account of Nepenthes in New Guinea" is a monograph by Matthew Jebb on the tropical pitcher plants of New Guinea. It was published in the March 1991 issue of Science in New Guinea, a journal of the University of Papua New Guinea. It remains the only major monograph devoted to the tropical pitcher plants of the island.

== Background ==
The monograph was the result of work carried out by Jebb during an extended stay at the Christensen Research Institute in Papua New Guinea. It was preceded by a brief account of New Guinea Nepenthes published in the 1989 book The Carnivorous Plants.

== Content ==
Jebb provided a species key and descriptions of 11 taxa: N. ampullaria, N. insignis, N. klossii, N. maxima, N. mirabilis, N. neoguineensis, N. paniculata, N. papuana, N. treubiana, N. vieillardii (confused with N. lamii; now known to be endemic to New Caledonia), and one undescribed species (later described as N. danseri).

In addition to its species descriptions, "An account of Nepenthes in New Guinea" includes a survey of the prey assemblage found in 52 pitchers (belonging to 20 plants) of N. mirabilis. Data is tabulated to compare the prey caught by lower and upper pitchers and to show the relationship between pitcher height and prey type.

== Reviews ==
Botanist Martin Cheek reviewed the monograph in the December 1992 issue of the Carnivorous Plant Newsletter. He praised the line drawings and noted that "with this account an outstanding gap has been filled". Cheek continued:

No other regional monograph of Nepenthes is as scientific in approach or as fully illustrated.

[...] Jebb excels in elaborating the architecture and predatory pattern of Nepenthes. As far as I am aware, he is the first to link the onset of 'upper' pitcher production with the initiation of flowering.

[...] Little detracts from this account. Very few typo's came to light [...].

Discussing the section on prey assemblage, Cheek wrote that "[f]or perhaps the first time then, the hard facts are provided on predatory patterns in Nepenthes". Cheek concludes by writing: "Anyone interested in any aspect of Nepenthes is urged to get and read this work."
