= The Genus Utricularia: A Taxonomic Monograph =

1989 monograph by Peter Taylor

- Cover of Peter Taylor's personal copy. The cover design was created by J. R. Stone based on Taylor's original pencil drawings.
- Author: Peter Taylor
- Language: English
- Publisher: HMSO
- Publication date: November 9, 1989 (reprinted in 1994)
- Media type: Print (softcover)
- Pages: xi + 724
- ISBN: 0-11-250046-3
- OCLC: 20762331

The Genus Utricularia: A Taxonomic Monograph is a monograph by Peter Taylor on the carnivorous plant genus Utricularia, the bladderworts. It was published in 1989 by Her Majesty's Stationery Office (HMSO) as the fourteenth entry in the Kew Bulletin Additional Series. It was reprinted for The Royal Botanic Gardens, Kew in 1994.

== Background ==
Taylor's monograph represented the culmination of 41 years of research, which included numerous field trips and herbarium visits (Taylor observed 90 species in habitat and estimated he had examined more than 50,000 herbarium specimens). More than 900 Utricularia taxon names had to be considered for the revision, the vast majority of which proved to be synonyms.

== Content ==
Taylor recognised 214 species, which he classified into two subgenera and 35 sections. No infraspecific taxa were recognised. Each species was illustrated with a full-page line drawing created by the author and inked in by Sue Hillier. Taylor's species list and classification are now generally accepted with some additions of newly described taxa and modifications based on phylogenetic studies.

== Reviews ==
The book was well received and in particular praised for its scope and comprehensiveness. Donald Schnell reviewed the work for the March 1990 issue of the Carnivorous Plant Newsletter:

Some may think me guilty of hyperbole after the following statement, but after careful consideration, I judge this to be the CP book publication event since Lloyd in 1942.

After forty years of backbreaking, sometimes heartbreaking, excruciatingly detailed and careful study of the genus Utricularia by this author, frequently working on his own time into nights and weekends, this is what we have been waiting for. The meticulous balance and perspective of studying many thousands of herbarium specimens and living plants in situ throughout the world range are all here. In a foreword, Kew Gardens Director Ghillean Prance notes that here we have the unusual complete taxonomic study (nowadays) of a large and complex genus, but also a genus which is global in extent.

[...] the book is soft cover but strongly manufactured. Paper and printing are excellent as is the line drawing and halftone work. There is a complete bibliography and index. I find the author's writing style to be particularly refreshing [in] these days of stilted academic conformity.

[...] I can recommend this book without reservation, and it should be in the personal library of all serious CP students, especially those who are working with utricularias at all.

In a 1991 issue of the Kew Bulletin, Christopher D. K. Cook wrote of Taylor's monograph: "It is no disappointment. It is an admirable work that will remain the standard account for many years." James L. Luteyn of the New York Botanical Garden also gave a positive appraisal in Brittonia: "Forty years of love and devotion are reflected in this marvelous tome by the world's authority on bladderworts." But he added: "Two comments on the down side are that the specimen citations are restricted mostly to the types, and that the cover (in my copy) became unglued after I reviewed it."
