= The Carnivorous Plants (1989 book) =

- Dust jacket showing Nepenthes pervillei
- Author: Barrie E. Juniper, Richard J. Robins, Daniel M. Joel
- Language: English
- Publisher: Academic Press
- Publication date: 1989
- Media type: Print (hardcover)
- Pages: xii + 353
- ISBN: 0-12-392170-8
- OCLC: 20955562

The Carnivorous Plants is a major work on carnivorous plants by Barrie E. Juniper, Richard J. Robins, and Daniel M. Joel. It was published in 1989 by Academic Press. Much of the book was written by the three authors over an eight-year period at Oxford University's Botany School (later the Department of Plant Sciences).

== Content ==
Although sharing its title with Francis Ernest Lloyd's classic 1942 work, this treatment focuses primarily on physiology and biochemistry, reflecting the authors' areas of expertise. It also deviates from Lloyd's work in that content is organised by biological mechanism rather than by genus.

The Carnivorous Plants includes around 1160 references and 174 figures, all of which are in black and white. The book has been described as "the most recent comprehensive scientific monograph" on carnivorous plants, and the third of its kind following Charles Darwin's Insectivorous Plants in 1875 and Lloyd's The Carnivorous Plants in 1942.

The book has two appendices: the first is a summary of letters sent by Rebecca Merritt Austin to William Marriott Canby regarding her field observations of Darlingtonia in the 1870s; the second concerns Matthew Jebb's observations of Nepenthes in Papua New Guinea (a precursor to Jebb's "An account of Nepenthes in New Guinea", published two years later).

== Reviews ==
Donald Schnell reviewed the work for the June 1989 issue of the Carnivorous Plant Newsletter:

Typeface is large and quite readable. Binding is of moderate quality (the boards of my copy came warped), and while the paper is not fully glazed, it is moderately heavy and reproduces the photowork well. [...] The authors certainly have their credentials in the area that is covered in most detail and best in the book: New concepts of anatomy, physiology, and biochemistry related to the carnivorphyte syndrome. [...] Unfortunately there are several errors of substance and omission, particularly in areas where the authors look into field botany, ecology, evolutions [sic] and plain "natural history".

Schnell noted that in some cases the book misquotes authors regarding their conclusions and that one should therefore "not use [it] as a secondary citation source". Schnell also commented on the book's original price of US$150, which he considered high given its print quality. He concluded by writing:

I can recommend this book as an addition to the rather scant carnivorous plant book literature, with the caveats mentioned above. The authors do bring forth some new material (even older references missed by Lloyd) and some stimulating discussion and concepts. However, the work is not encyclopedic as many might hope it would be.

P. M. Smith, writing in New Phytologist, considered the book to present "a comprehensive biology of carnivory in plants, with up-to-date facts, informed evaluations and speculations about morphological and physiological adaptations, and how they may have originated", but added that "[t]here are no great surprises". He also pointed out the book's "unevenness of style" and "occasionally tortuous" writing, concluding: "A more critical and systematic editorial policy would have made the book significantly shorter, clearer and cheaper – hence better."

In a 1991 review for the Kew Bulletin, Martin Cheek wrote that the book "is like no other on the subject" and "provides a 'modern scientific' insight into the carnivorous mechanisms of plants". However, he thought that the layout of the book "makes for very disjointed reading if one is pursuing all the information pertaining to one plant". Cheek also pointed out a number of inconsistencies and taxonomic errors in the text (the genus Sarracenia, for example, is said to have 7, 8, and "14 or so" species on different pages), although he wrote that "[i]nconsistencies are inevitable in a multi-author volume such as this".

Reviewing the book for the Bulletin of the Australian Carnivorous Plant Society, Brett Lymn described it as "a serious scientific work" though "not just a book for academics". He continued: "The actual information contained in the book is detailed and sometimes very scientific but on the whole, the text can be read and enjoyed by someone that has a keen interest in learning more about the plants that they cultivate." Lymn recommended it as "a good addition to the library of any serious grower of Carnivorous Plants who has deep pockets".
