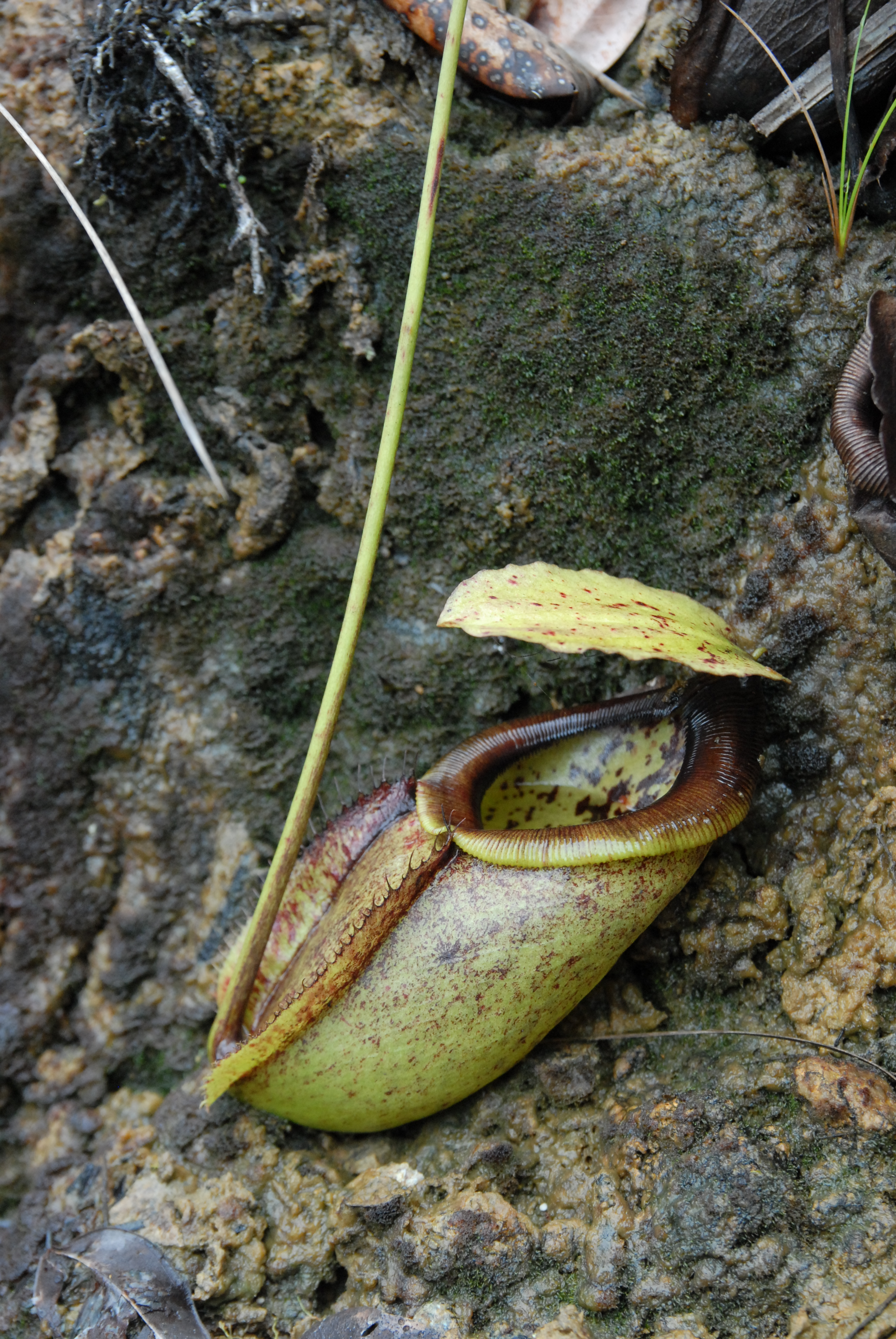

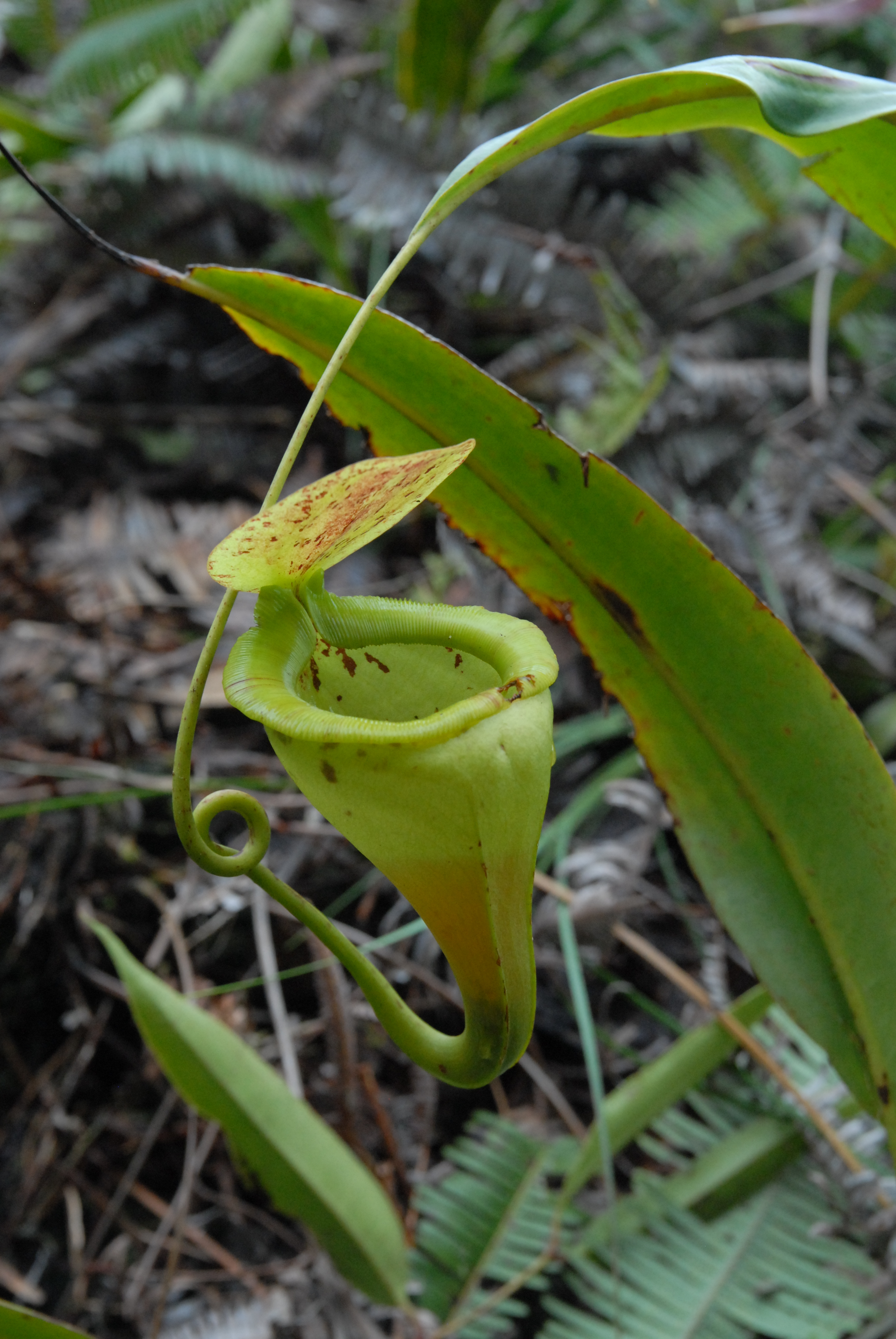
- Lower (top) and upper pitchers from the Doorman Massif, New Guinea

Conservation status
- Endangered (IUCN 3.1)

Scientific classification
- Kingdom: Plantae
- Clade: Tracheophytes
- Clade: Angiosperms
- Clade: Eudicots
- Order: Caryophyllales
- Family: Nepenthaceae
- Genus: Nepenthes
- Species: N. paniculata

Binomial name
- Nepenthes paniculata Danser (1928)

= Nepenthes paniculata =

Species of pitcher plant from New Guinea

Nepenthes paniculata (/nɪˈpɛnθiːz ˌpænɪkjʊˈlɑːtə/; from Latin panicula "panicle") is a tropical pitcher plant belonging to the genus Nepenthes.

== Distribution and habitat ==
Nepenthes paniculata is probably endemic to Doorman Top, a mountain in New Guinea (03°28′01″S 138°26′59″E). In recent times it has been recorded from mossy forest on a ridge top at 1,460 m altitude.

== Hybrids ==
No forms or varieties of this species have been described. It may form natural hybrids with N. papuana.

== Botanical history ==
In 1994, A. Wistuba, H. Rischer, B. Baumgartl, and B. Kistler explored Doorman Top in search of N. paniculata but found no Nepenthes other than N. lamii (then known as N. vieillardii) and N. maxima. However, they climbed a different slope to the one from which N. paniculata was originally collected.

In August 2013, the species was rediscovered by a team consisting of Holger Gossner, Thomas Gronemeyer, David Marwinski, Stewart McPherson, Marius Micheler, Joachim Nerz, Andreas Wistuba, and Urs Zimmermann. This expedition was the first to document the lower pitchers, which superficially resemble those of N. merrilliana and species related to it from the Philippines.

Nepenthes paniculata holotype (Lam 1569)
