= Barrie Juniper =

British plant scientist (1932–2023)

- Born: 1932
- Died: 29 January 2023 (aged 90)
- Known for: The Story of the Apple
- Scientific career
- Fields: Plant sciences, genetics
- Workplaces: University of Oxford; St Catherine's College, Oxford

Barrie Edward Juniper (21 February 1932–29 January 2023) was a British plant scientist. He was emeritus reader in plant sciences at the University of Oxford and Fellow Emeritus of St Catherine's College, Oxford.

== Career ==
Juniper undertook much research into apples and fruit-related subjects and was the author of many associated papers and scholarly works. Intrigued by the differing opinions on the source of our modern day domestic apples, he embarked on a project to discover and record their origin and geographical spread over time.

Using DNA analysis of apple varieties from across the world, his work determined that all domestic apples shared the same DNA and that this was not the same as the various wild crab apple species known around the world. Until that point, it had been assumed by many that the domestic apple had been developed from these. However, a relationship was found with the wild apple forests of the Tian Shan mountains of central Asia. Juniper carried out fieldwork in Kazakhstan to explore the hypothesis that modern apples originated there and postulated that they were brought into popular use alongside the domestication of horses. His view was that the two species were associated closely thereafter, with both spreading together geographically.

Juniper was Curator of the University's parks, a role that included looking after gardens as well as parks and other green spaces owned by the University. One of these was the walled garden at Wytham Abbey. As part of his research into the origins of the apple, he established a specimen orchard there, to provide the collection of trees for his DNA analysis.

=== Publications ===
With co-author David Mabberley, Juniper wrote 'The Story of the Apple', which documented his research, travels and conclusions. It has been translated into many languages.

The Carnivorous Plants was authored by Juniper, Richard J. Robins, and Daniel M. Joel. It was published in 1989 by Academic Press.
