= Bere Bay =

Bay in Nunavut, Canada

- Location within Nunavut
- Location: Norwegian Bay
- Coordinates: 76°54′N 94°13′W
- Basin countries: Canada
- Settlements: Uninhabited

Bere Bay is an Arctic waterway in the Qikiqtaaluk Region, Nunavut, Canada. It is located in Norwegian Bay, off Devon Island's Grinnell Peninsula. Triton Bay is to the southeast.
