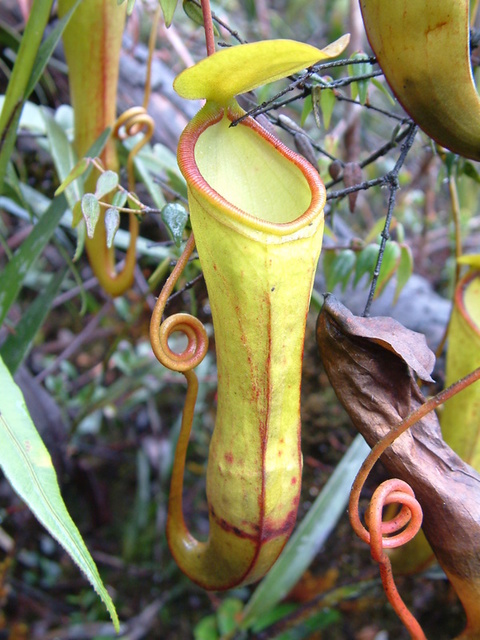

Conservation status
- Least Concern (IUCN 3.1)

Scientific classification
- Kingdom: Plantae
- Clade: Tracheophytes
- Clade: Angiosperms
- Clade: Eudicots
- Order: Caryophyllales
- Family: Nepenthaceae
- Genus: Nepenthes
- Species: N. monticola

Binomial name
- Nepenthes monticola A.S.Rob., Wistuba, Nerz, M.Mansur & S.McPherson (2011)

= Nepenthes monticola =

Tropical pitcher plant endemic to New Guinea

Nepenthes monticola is a tropical pitcher plant known from a number of mountains in the west central highlands of western New Guinea, where it grows at elevations of 1,400–2,620 m above sea level. Prior to its description as a species in 2011, N. monticola was lumped with the closely related N. lamii.
