= Nepenthes aenigma =

Scientific classification
- Kingdom: Plantae
- Clade: Tracheophytes
- Clade: Angiosperms
- Clade: Eudicots
- Order: Caryophyllales
- Family: Nepenthaceae
- Genus: Nepenthes
- Species: N. aenigma

Binomial name
- Nepenthes aenigma Nuytemans, W.Suarez & Calaramo (2016)

Synonyms
- Nepenthes sp. Luzon S.McPherson (2011)

Species of pitcher plant from the Philippines

Nepenthes aenigma is a tropical pitcher plant known from two mountains in Ilocos Norte province on the Philippine island of Luzon, where it grows at an elevation of around 1200 m above sea level. The species is notable for growing among dense vegetation in deep shade. It shows similarities to N. burkei and N. ventricosa.

== Description ==
They are mostly hairless plants, but do have small brown hairs on traps that are undeveloped. These plants also have buds that are dormant and sit above each leaf. This species has been seen preying on ants, spiders, mosquito larvae, and roaches in stages of decomposition.

== Taxonomy ==
The species was originally discovered in April 2002 by ornithologist Herman Nuytemans and was only relocated in the wild just over 10 years later. Prior to its formal description the species was known under the placeholder name "Nepenthes sp. Luzon".

=== Etymology ===
The specific epithet aenigma is Latin for "enigma" or "riddle" and refers to the species' "very unusual ecological preferences" of growing in deep shade.
