= Robert Falconer =

Canadian theologian and historian (1867–1943)

The Reverend Sir Robert Falconer KCMG FRSC
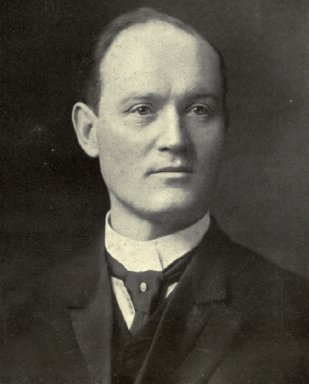

5th President of the University of Toronto
- In office 1907–1932
- Chancellor: William Ralph Meredith; Byron Edmund Walker; William Mulock
- Preceded by: Maurice Hutton (acting)
- Succeeded by: Henry John Cody

President of the Royal Society of Canada
- In office 1931–1932
- Preceded by: Charles Camsell
- Succeeded by: Francis Ernest Lloyd

Personal details
- Born: February 10, 1867 Charlottetown, Prince Edward Island
- Died: November 4, 1943 (aged 76)
- Education: University of Edinburgh

Sir Robert Alexander Falconer KCMG FRSC (10 February 1867 – 4 November 1943) was a Canadian academic, Calvinist and bible scholar who was the fifth president of the University of Toronto, serving from 1907 to 1932.

== Early life ==
Of Scottish descent, Falconer was born on February 10, 1867, in Charlottetown, Prince Edward Island, the eldest child of a Presbyterian minister and his wife. He attended Queen's Royal College in Port of Spain, Trinidad while his father was posted there and won a scholarship to the University of Edinburgh in Scotland. He graduated MA in 1889 and then spent three years at the divinity school of the Free Church of Scotland.

== Career ==
Falconer was ordained in 1892 but never held a clerical position. He returned to Canada that year and took a lecturership in New Testament Greek and exegesis at the Presbyterian College in Halifax. He also began to publish articles in learned journals. In 1902 Falconer received a D.Litt. from Edinburgh University.

== Advocacy and knighthood ==
In 1907 he became president of the University of Toronto. He steered a middle path, combining pure scholarship with practicality. Thus he introduced more vocational subjects, while also developing higher degree programmes. He sought to maximise the independence of the university, battling unsuccessfully to retain German faculty members in 1914. Nonetheless he was knighted in 1917 for his advocacy of wartime recruitment. Falconer believed in the need to increase public awareness of, and accessibility to, Canada's historical records. He was a long time member of The Champlain Society's Council, serving as its Vice-President (1909-1935) and President (1936-42).

Falconer wrote several books on current affairs, including The German Tragedy and its Meaning for Canada (1915), Idealism in National Character (1920) and The United States as a Neighbour (1925). He was an advocate of broad cooperation between the English speaking nations in international affairs, but was concerned to avoid American dominance of these relationships.

== Retirement and death ==
Ill health obliged him to decline the principalship of the University of Edinburgh in 1929, and he retired in 1932. However he continued his scholarly work, becoming the first President of the Canadian Society of Biblical Studies in 1933 and producing Pastoral Epistles in 1937, his most notable work of religious scholarship.

Falconer died at the age of 76, on November 4, 1943.

== Honours ==
- Fellow of the Royal Society of Canada (1916).
- Yale University, Honorary Doctorate (1922).
- University of Alberta, Honorary Doctorate (1936).

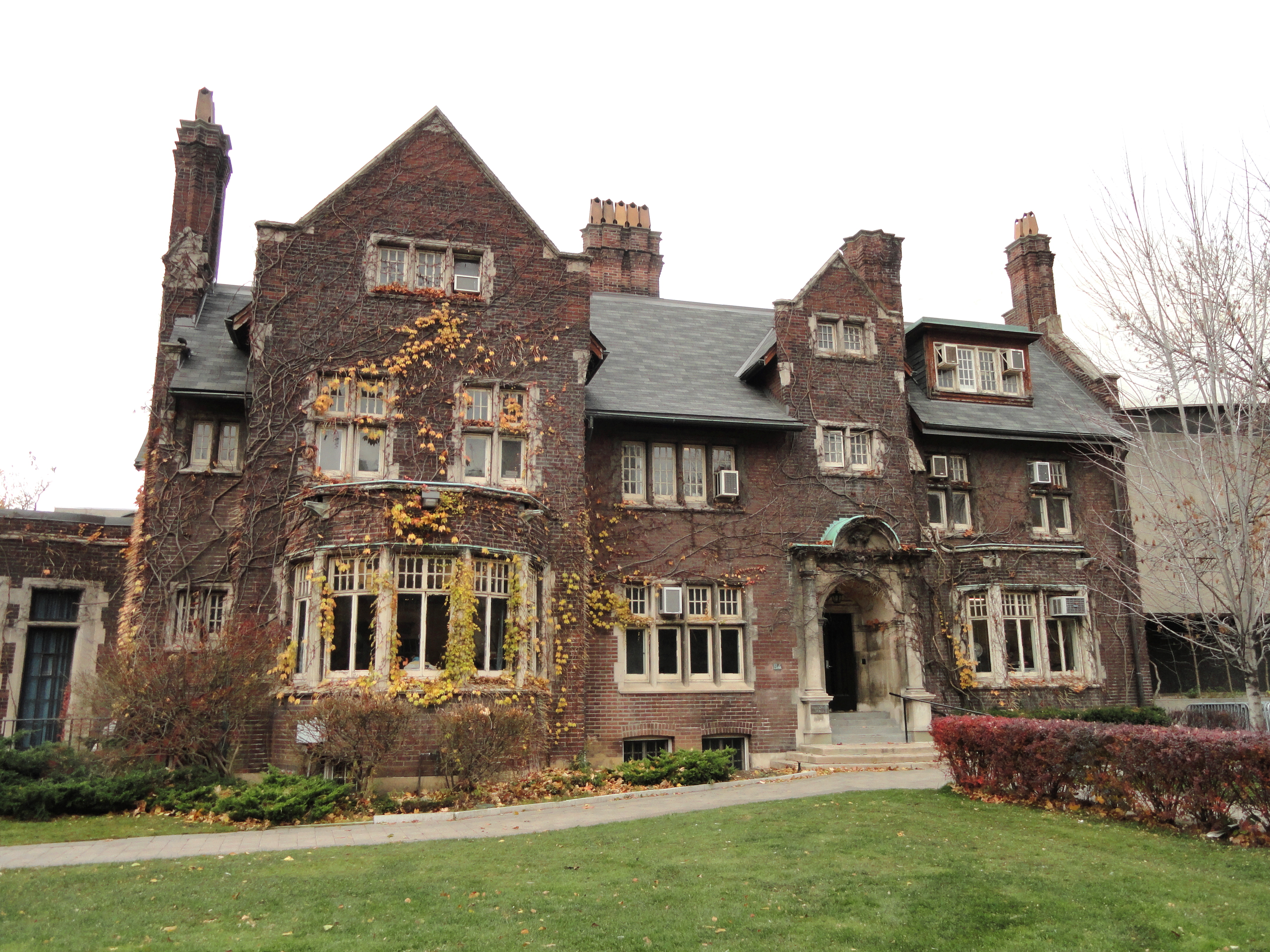
On its acquisition by U of T Faculty of Law in 1951, 84 Queen's Park was renamed Falconer Hall in honor of Sir Robert Falconer.

== Sources ==
- Greenlee, James G. (1988). Sir Robert Falconer: A Biography. University of Toronto Press. ISBN 978-1-4426-7997-9. OCLC 244767816.

Professional and academic associations
| Preceded by Charles Camsell | President of the Royal Society of Canada; 1931–1932 | Succeeded by Francis Ernest Lloyd |
