= Nepenthes appendiculata =

Conservation status
- Least Concern (IUCN 3.1)

Scientific classification
- Kingdom: Plantae
- Clade: Tracheophytes
- Clade: Angiosperms
- Clade: Eudicots
- Order: Caryophyllales
- Family: Nepenthaceae
- Genus: Nepenthes
- Species: N. appendiculata

Binomial name
- Nepenthes appendiculata Chi.C.Lee, Bourke, Rembold, W.Taylor & S.T.Yeo (2011)

Species of pitcher plant from Borneo

Nepenthes appendiculata is a tropical pitcher plant known only from the Hose Mountains of central Sarawak, Borneo, where it grows at elevations of 1450–1700 m above sea level. The species is characterised by an enlarged glandular appendage on the lower lid surface, for which it is named.
