= Triton Bay =

Bay in Nunavut, Canada

- Location within Nunavut
- Location: Norwegian Bay
- Coordinates: 76°36′N 92°23′W
- Ocean/sea sources: Arctic Ocean
- Basin countries: Canada
- Settlements: Uninhabited

Triton Bay is an Arctic waterway in the Qikiqtaaluk Region, Nunavut, Canada. It is located in Norwegian Bay off Devon Island's Grinnell Peninsula. To the northwest is Bere Bay.
