= Francis Ernest Lloyd =

American botanist (1868–1947)

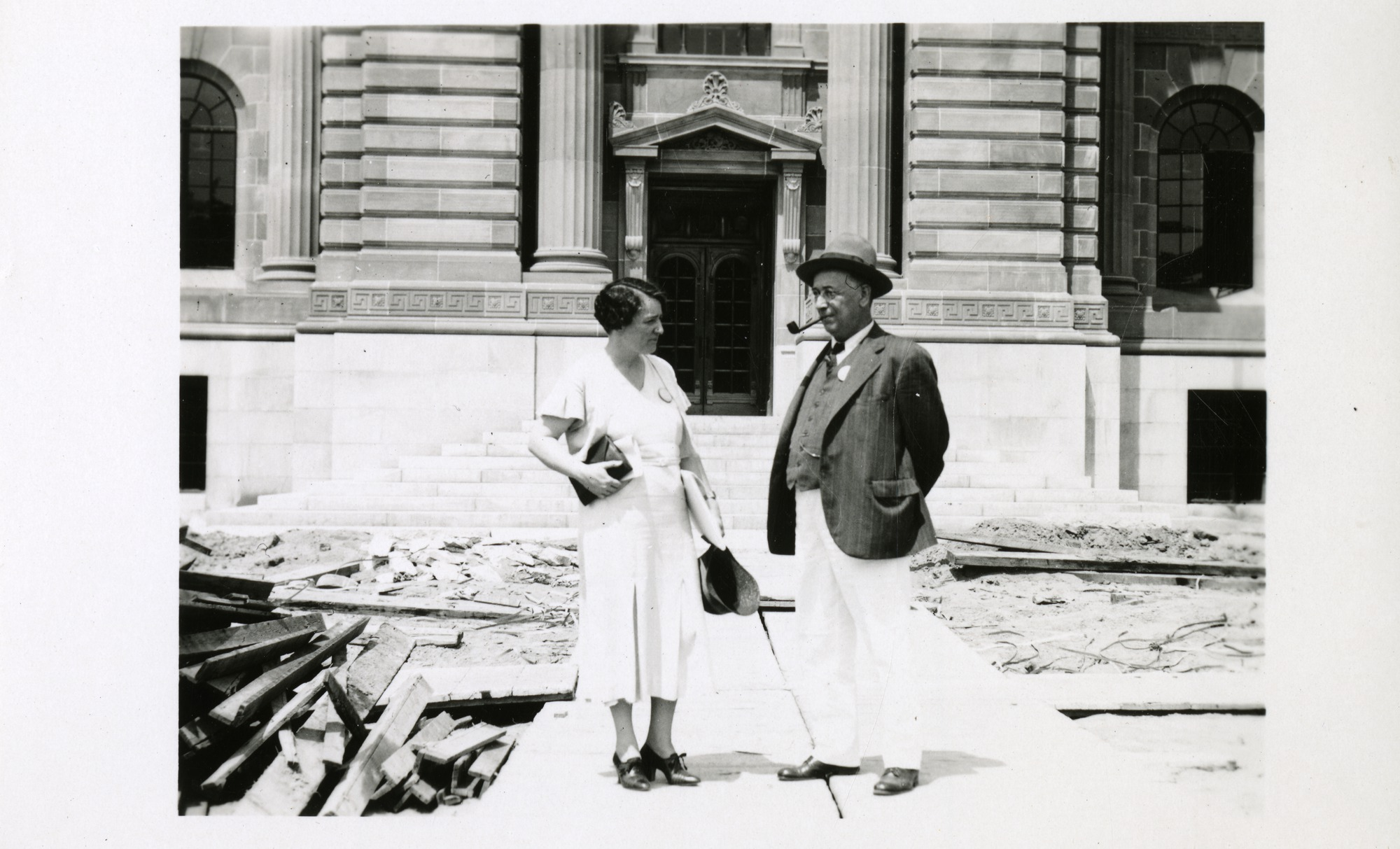
- Francis Ernest Lloyd (right) with chemist Helen Miles Davis
- Born: October 4, 1868; Manchester, England
- Died: October 10, 1947 (aged 79); Carmel, California (USA)
- Scientific career
- Fields: Botany; Cytology
- Workplaces: Williams College; Pacific University; Teachers College, Columbia University; Harvard University; Alabama Polytechnic Institute; McGill University; Desert Botanical Laboratory; Arizona Experiment Station

Francis Ernest Lloyd (October 4, 1868 – October 10, 1947) was an American botanist.

== Life ==
Lloyd was born in Manchester, England, and educated at Princeton University (A.B., 1891; A.M., 1895), in New Jersey, and in Europe at Munich and Bonn, in Germany. He was employed at various institutions of higher learning from 1891 onward. He served on the faculties of Williams College, Pacific University, Teachers College (Columbia University), Harvard Summer School, Alabama Polytechnic Institute (professor of botany, 1906–1912), and at McGill University, in Montreal, Quebec, Canada after 1912.

Lloyd worked as an investigator in the Desert Botanical Laboratory of the Carnegie Institution in 1906 and as cytologist of the Arizona Experiment Station in 1907. He edited The Plant World from 1905 to 1908, and was co-author of The Teaching of Biology in the Secondary Schools (1904; second edition, 1914).

== Works ==
Lloyd wrote:

- The Comparative Embryology of the Rubiaceae (1902)
- with Maurice A. Bigelow, The Teaching of Biology in the Secondary School (1904) LCCN 04-22995
  - Lloyd, Francis Ernest; Bigelow, Maurice Alpheus (1914). 2nd edition. LCCN 14018896.
- The Physiology of Stomata (1908)
- Guayule (1911)
- The Carnivorous Plants (1942) Lloyd, Francis Ernest (13 December 2011). 2011 reprint. Read Books. ISBN 9781447495581.

Professional and academic associations
Preceded by Robert Falconer	President of the Royal Society of Canada; 1932–1933	Succeeded by Léon Gérin
