= The Carnivorous Plants =

- Blue cloth binding and gilt title of the first edition
- Author: Francis Ernest Lloyd
- Language: English
- Publisher: Chronica Botanica Company
- Publication date: 1942 (reprinted in 1976)
- Media type: Print (hardcover, softcover)
- Pages: xvi + 352
- ISBN: 0-486-23321-9
- OCLC: 30913937

The Carnivorous Plants is a major work on carnivorous plants by American botanist Francis Ernest Lloyd. It was first published in 1942 by the Chronica Botanica Company as the ninth volume of A New Series of Plant Science Books. It was reprinted in 1976 by Dover Publications of New York and Constable of London. Although primarily dealing with plants, the book also briefly covers carnivorous fungi. The chapter describing the structure and functioning of Utricularia traps is particularly detailed. Lloyd's book was the most important scientific work on carnivorous plants since Charles Darwin's Insectivorous Plants of 1875.

== Reviews ==
A contemporaneous review by Edwin B. Matzke of Columbia University reads:

Professor Lloyd has written a scholarly, complete, authoritative volume—one that will take its place fittingly on the library shelf beside Charles Darwin's "Insectivorous Plants," published in 1873 [sic]. The author writes with clarity, with conviction and on occasion with a touch of humor. And if, at times, his presentation seems intricate and involved, as in the Utricularia trap, so is the subject.

B. E. Juniper, R. J. Robins and D. M. Joel, who chose the same title for their 1989 book, wrote: "Lloyd's book is intense, detailed and virtually comprehensive; he combined wit, wisdom and a polished literary style with an insatiable curiosity and a voluminous knowledge."

Peter D'Amato wrote of the book's importance—and limitations—in the June 2010 issue of the Carnivorous Plant Newsletter:

For nearly forty years, The Carnivorous Plants remained the only popular scientific book on the subject, and it remains vivid, engrossing and very well written. Published as World War II was exploding, photographs were unfortunately reduced to small black and white pictures confined to the back of the book due to constraints in costs. Lloyd’s own line drawings clearly illustrate details of cell structure and other things scientific, for this is a science book, not one on horticulture. Each chapter gives a brief introduction to the genus in question, then proceeds to review various scientific papers published by researchers over the previous decades, many by Lloyd himself and other well known botanists. From this he draws conclusions, and often raises many questions.
