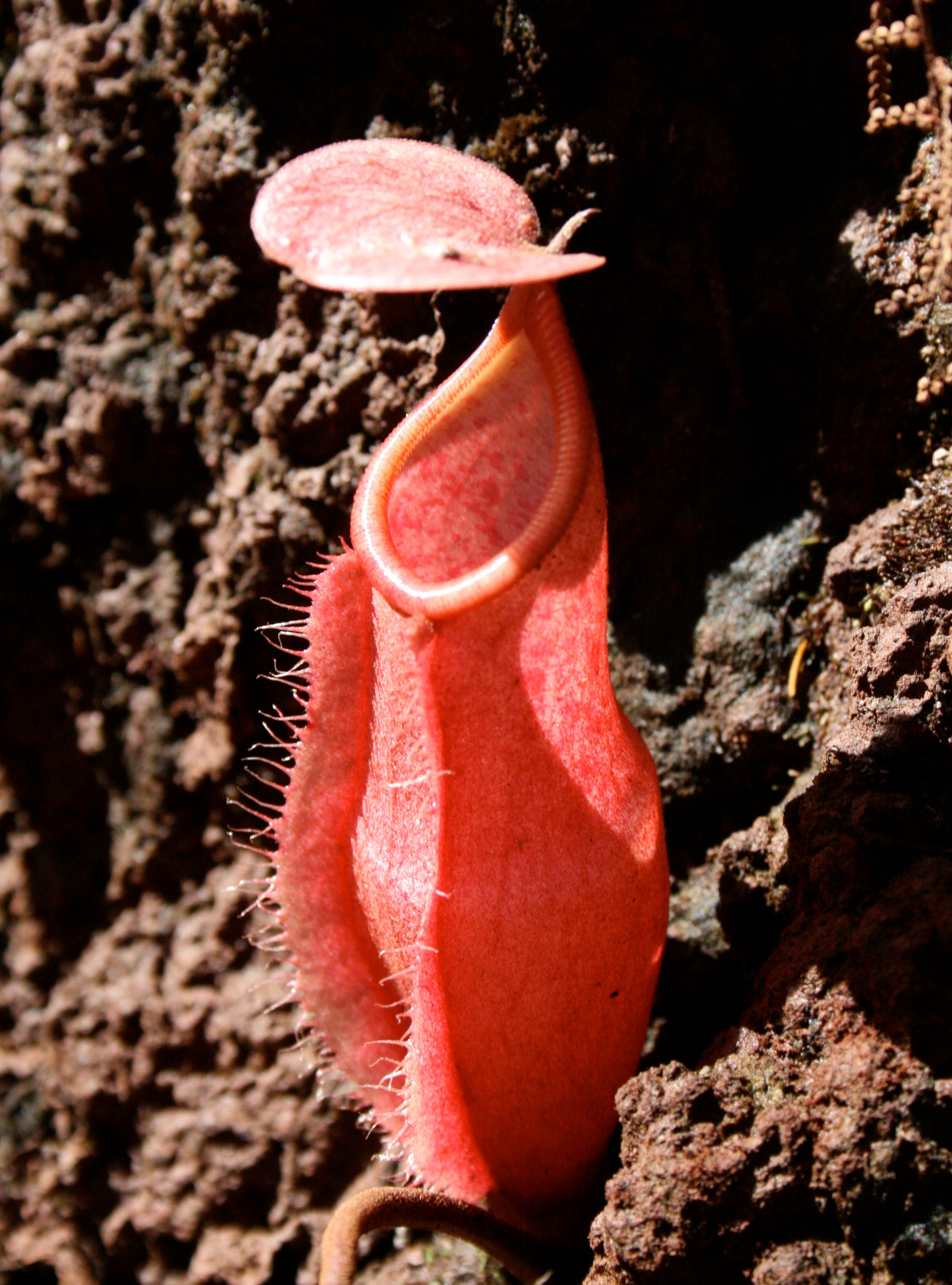
- A lower pitcher of Nepenthes vieillardii from Rivière Bleue, New Caledonia

Conservation status
- Least Concern (IUCN 3.1)

Scientific classification
- Kingdom: Plantae
- Clade: Tracheophytes
- Clade: Angiosperms
- Clade: Eudicots
- Order: Caryophyllales
- Family: Nepenthaceae
- Genus: Nepenthes
- Species: N. vieillardii

Binomial name
- Nepenthes vieillardii Hook.f. (1873)

Synonyms
- Synonyms: Nepenthes ampullaria auct. non Jack: Jeanneney (1894); Nepenthes bongso auct. non Korth.: Guillaum. (1911); Nepenthes distillatoria auct. non L.: Jeanneney (1894); Nepenthes humilis S.Moore (1921); Nepenthes montrouzieri Dub. (1906); Nepenthes neocaledonica F.Muell. ex Heckel (1892) nom.nud.; Heterochresonyms: Nepenthes vieillardii auct. non Hook.f.: Danser (1928); Jebb (1991) [=N. lamii/N. vieillardii]; Nepenthes vieillardii auct. non Hook.f.: Hort. ex Studnička (1989) [=N. mirabilis]

= Nepenthes vieillardii =

Species of pitcher plant from Polynesia

Nepenthes vieillardii (/nɪˈpɛnθiːz ˌviːɛˈlɑːrdiaɪ/; after Eugène Vieillard, collector of plants from New Caledonia and Tahiti between 1861 and 1867) is a species of pitcher plant endemic to the island of New Caledonia. Its distribution is the most easterly of any Nepenthes species. Its natural habitat is shrublands or forests, to about 900 metres (3,000 ft) altitude.

Tripteroides caledonicus mosquitoes breed in the pitchers of this species.

== Infraspecific Taxa ==
- Nepenthes vieillardii var. deplanchei Dub. (1906)
- Nepenthes vieillardii var. humilis (Moore) Guilliaum. (1964)
- Nepenthes vieillardii var. minima Guillaum. (1953)
- Nepenthes vieillardii var. montrouzieri (Dub.) Macfarl. (1908)
