= Nepenthes nebularum =

Scientific classification
- Kingdom: Plantae
- Clade: Tracheophytes
- Clade: Angiosperms
- Clade: Eudicots
- Order: Caryophyllales
- Family: Nepenthaceae
- Genus: Nepenthes
- Species: N. nebularum

Binomial name
- Nepenthes nebularum G.Mansell & W.Suarez (2016)

Species of pitcher plant from the Philippines

Nepenthes nebularum is a tropical pitcher plant native to southeastern Mindanao in the Philippines. The species was described by Geoff Mansell, owner of Exotica Plants, and Filipino botanist Wally Suarez. It has so far been recorded with certainty from only two mountains, Mount Hafas & undisclosed location, where it grows in submontane mossy forest at an altitude of up to 1800 m above sea level. It has been found nearto N. copelandii, N. truncata, and a taxon matching the description of N. cornuta.

== Discovery ==
In September 2011 participants on a trip to a remote mountain on south-eastern Mindanao, Stewart McPherson sighted epiphytically growing black Nepenthes truncata-like plants and photos were taken from a distance; it was stated by some of the participants on this same trip that this was evidence of the then newly described N. robcantleyi in habitat. However, due to the distance and foggy surroundings, no real distinguishing features could be observed in the photo except for superficial similarities to both N. truncata.

On seeing the photo and noticing differences between these plants and N. robcantleyi, Exotica Plants organized several trips to the mountain in 2012 in hope of obtaining more details of the plants. These were undertaken by Philippine botanist and Nepenthes/orchid taxonomist Wally Suarez. The mountain was very foggy, leeches as well as spiny rattans were abundant, which made the ascent difficult. After three attempts the expedition successfully located a colony of the plants and a set of photographs were obtained which clearly distinguished these plants as different from both N. robcantleyi and N. truncata.

== Relationship to Nepenthes robcantleyi ==
Nepenthes nebularum shows close affinities to N. robcantleyi and N. truncata.

Nepenthes robcantleyi is currently known from one region of Mindanao, Philippines, where it occurs from sub-montane to upper montane forest.

At least two commercial horticulturists (such as Geoff Mansell of Exotica Plants) have suggested that nebularum does differ from N. robcantleyi in cultivation and therefore warrants separate species status.

The authors of N. nebularum suggest that N. robcantleyi might represent a natural hybrid between N. nebularum and N. truncata, but until more molecular genetics evidence elucidates the link between the hybrid connection, and N. nebularum actually being a species, this cannot be officially confirmed.

== Distribution and habitat ==
The specific epithet nebularum refers to the foggy habitat in which it was discovered.
