= Nepenthes × truncalata =

Scientific classification
- Kingdom: Plantae
- Clade: Tracheophytes
- Clade: Angiosperms
- Clade: Eudicots
- Order: Caryophyllales
- Family: Nepenthaceae
- Genus: Nepenthes
- Species: N. × truncalata

Binomial name
- Nepenthes × truncalata Hort.Bednar (1994) nom.nud.

Species of carnivorous plant

Nepenthes × truncalata (/nɪˈpɛnθiːz ˌtrʌŋkəˈlɑːtə/; a blend of truncata and alata) is a natural hybrid involving N. alata and N. truncata. Like its two parent species, it is endemic to the Philippines, but limited in distribution by the natural range of N. truncata on Mindanao.
