= Robert Cantley =

Robert Cantley is a conservationist and Managing Director of Borneo Exotics, a Sri Lankan-based plant nursery specialising in tissue-cultured and seed-grown Nepenthes species and hybrids. Cantley has contributed to a number of papers on Nepenthes. The species Nepenthes robcantleyi, the natural hybrid Nepenthes × cantleyi and the cultivar Nepenthes 'Cantley's Red' are named after him.

== Borneo Exotics ==
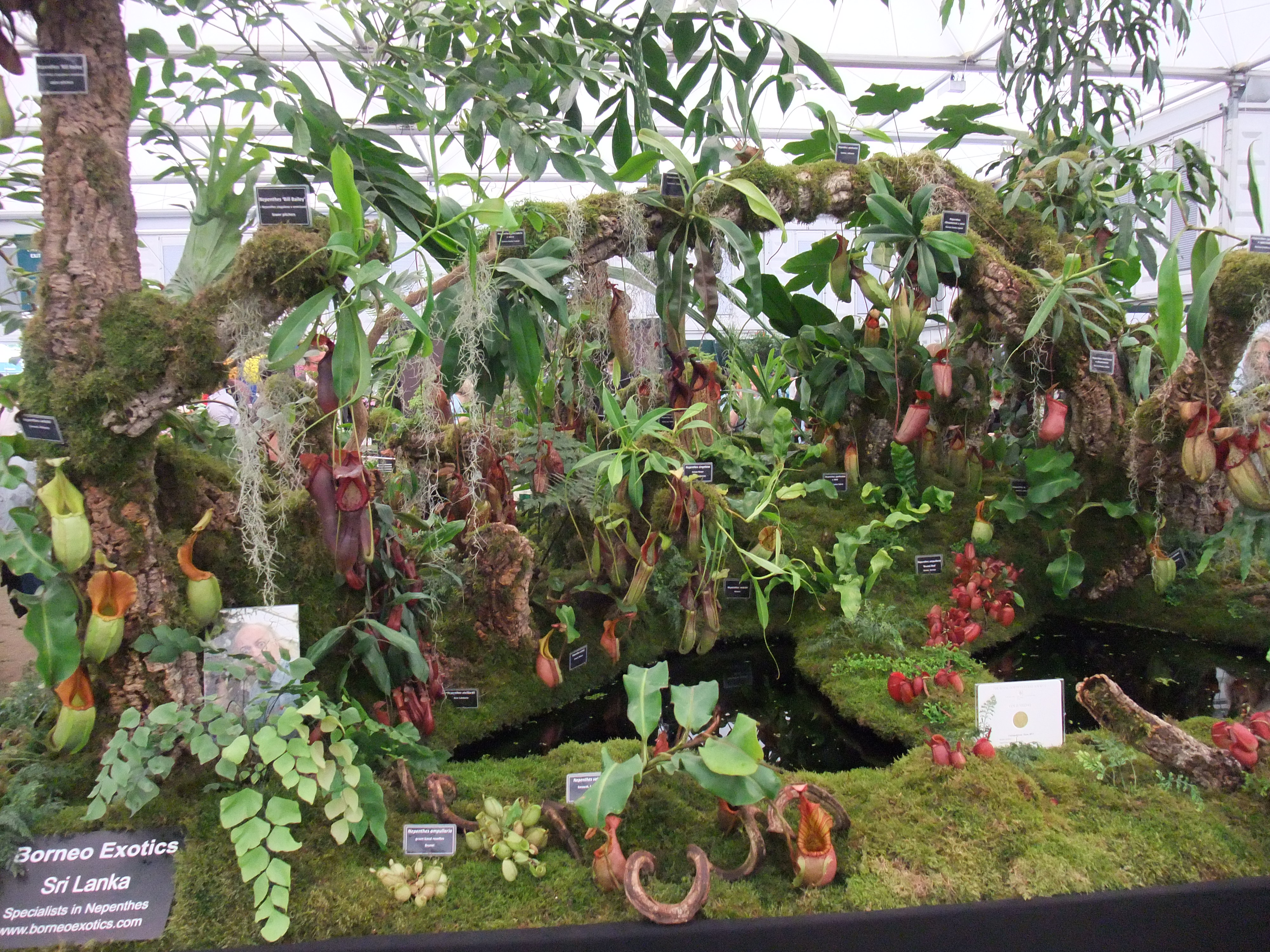
The Gold Medal-winning Borneo Exotics display at the 2011 Chelsea Flower Show

Borneo Exotics was established by Cantley and Diana Williams in 1997. As of 2009, the nursery stocked more than 130 Nepenthes taxa, totalling over 180,000 plants annually. In Pitcher Plants of the Old World, Stewart McPherson described it as "the world's foremost specialist producer of Nepenthes species".

As of 2011, Borneo Exotics operated a number of growing facilities spread over two locations: lowland species were kept at a nursery in Moragahahena and highlanders in Lindula. The company won a Gold Medal at the Chelsea Flower Show in 2006, 2007, 2010, and 2011, and a Silver Gilt Medal in 2005. Borneo Exotics also won a silver medal and two other awards at the World Orchid Exhibition in 2011.
