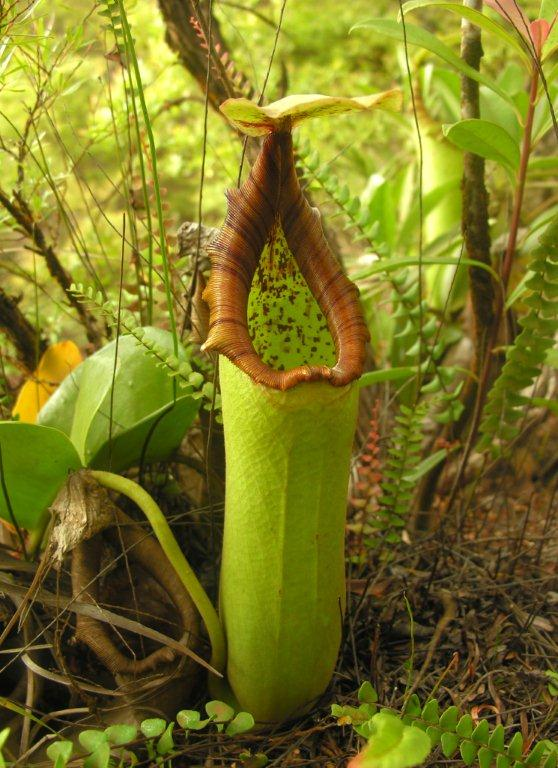
- A pitcher of N. truncata found in northern Mindanao at an elevation of 230 m

Conservation status
- Endangered (IUCN 2.3)

Scientific classification
- Kingdom: Plantae
- Clade: Embryophytes
- Clade: Tracheophytes
- Clade: Angiosperms
- Clade: Eudicots
- Order: Caryophyllales
- Family: Nepenthaceae
- Genus: Nepenthes
- Species: N. truncata

Binomial name
- Nepenthes truncata Macfarl. (1911)

Synonyms
- Nepenthes megamphora Merr. & Quis in sched. (1915)

= Nepenthes truncata =

Species of pitcher plant from the Philippines

Nepenthes truncata (/nɪˈpɛnθiːz trʌŋˈkɑːtə/; from Latin truncatus "terminating abruptly") is a tropical pitcher plant endemic to the Philippines. It is known from the islands of Dinagat, Leyte, and Mindanao. The species grows at an elevation of 0–1,500 m above sea level. Nepenthes truncata is characterised by its heart-shaped (truncate) leaves and very large pitchers, which can reach up to 40 cm in height.

Nepenthes robcantleyi was once considered a dark, highland form of this species.

== Carnivory ==
On September 29, 2006, at the Botanical Gardens in Lyon, France, a Nepenthes truncata was photographed containing the decomposing corpse of a mouse. This incident is the first record of a mammal being successfully trapped in the pitchers of N. truncata indoors. Both N. rajah and N. rafflesiana are known to occasionally catch small mammals in the wild. Although it is possible for Nepenthes truncata to trap mice, the calcium heavy bones will not be digested.

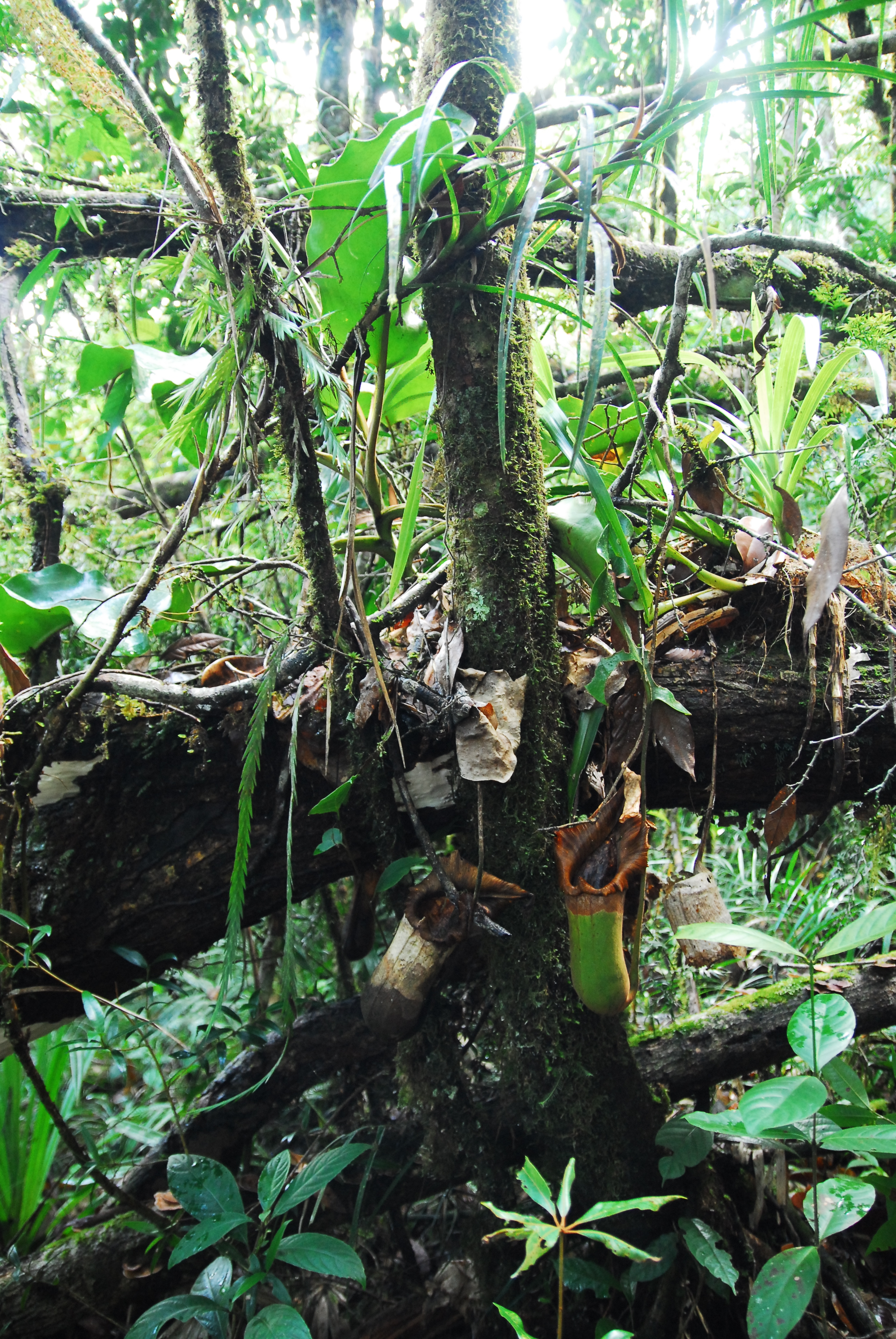
An epiphytic N. truncata from the Pantaron Range near San Fernando

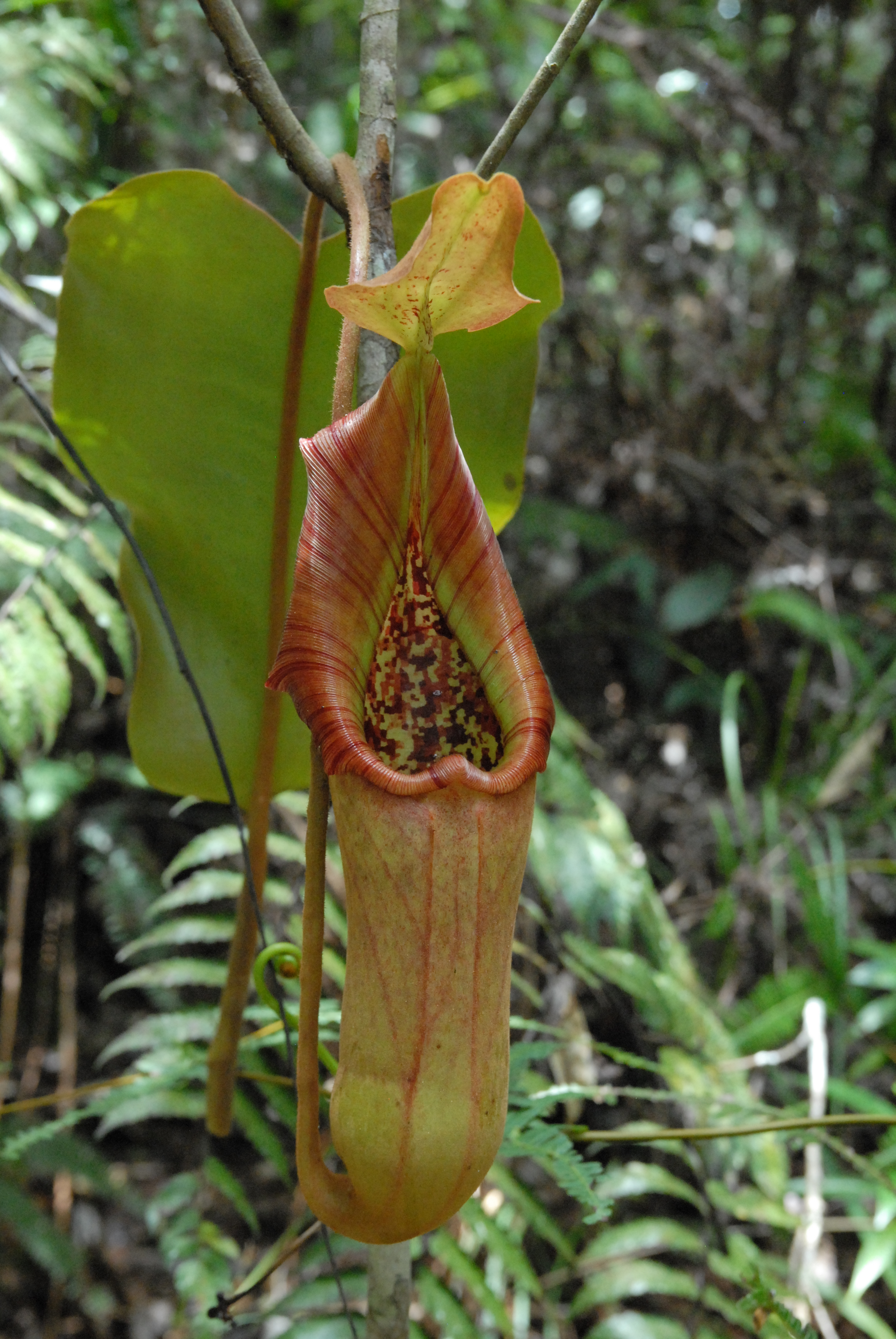
A recently opened pitcher with typical colouration from the Pantaron Range, Mindanao

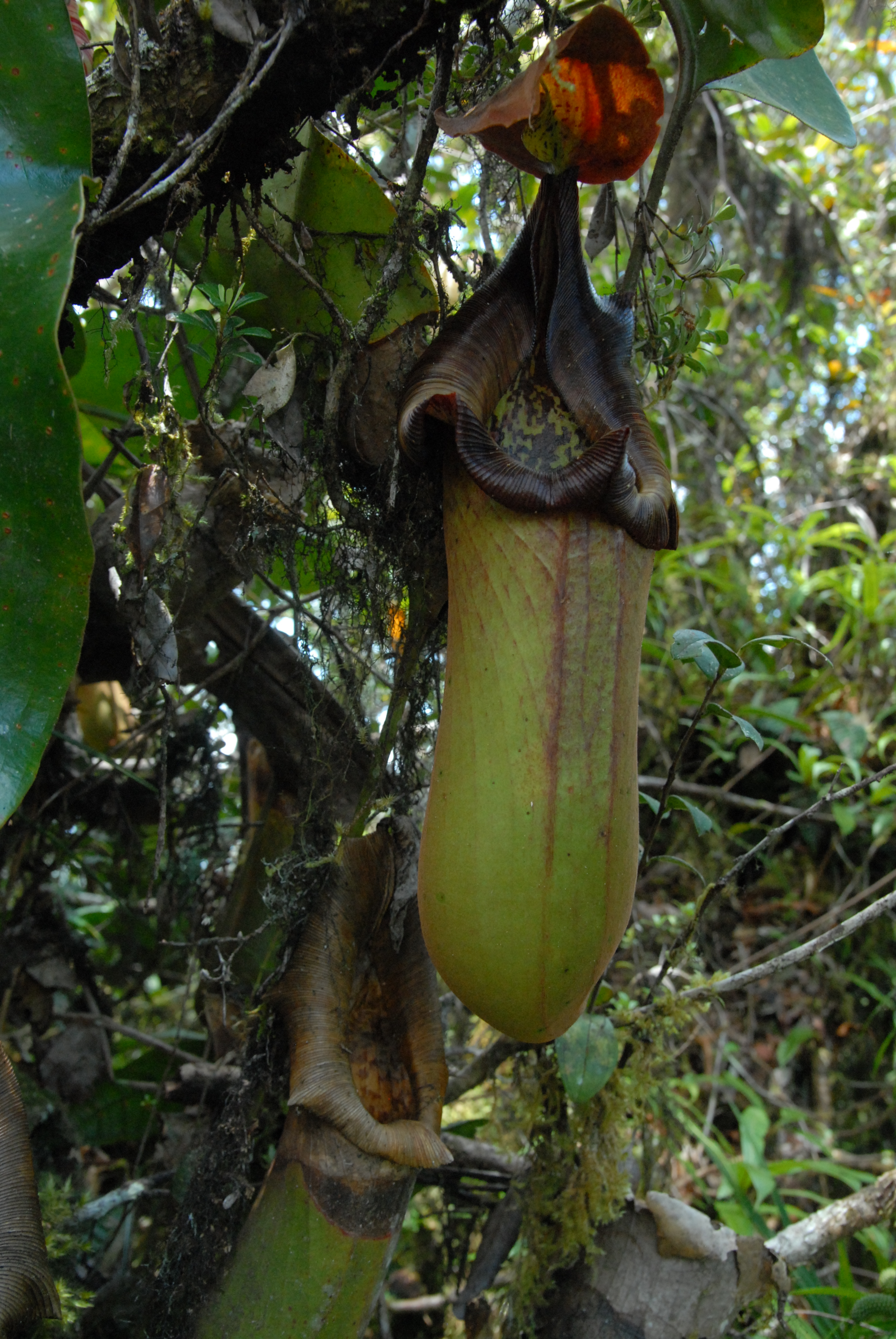
A pitcher with strongly developed peristome colouration, typical of older pitchers, Pantaron Range, Mindanao

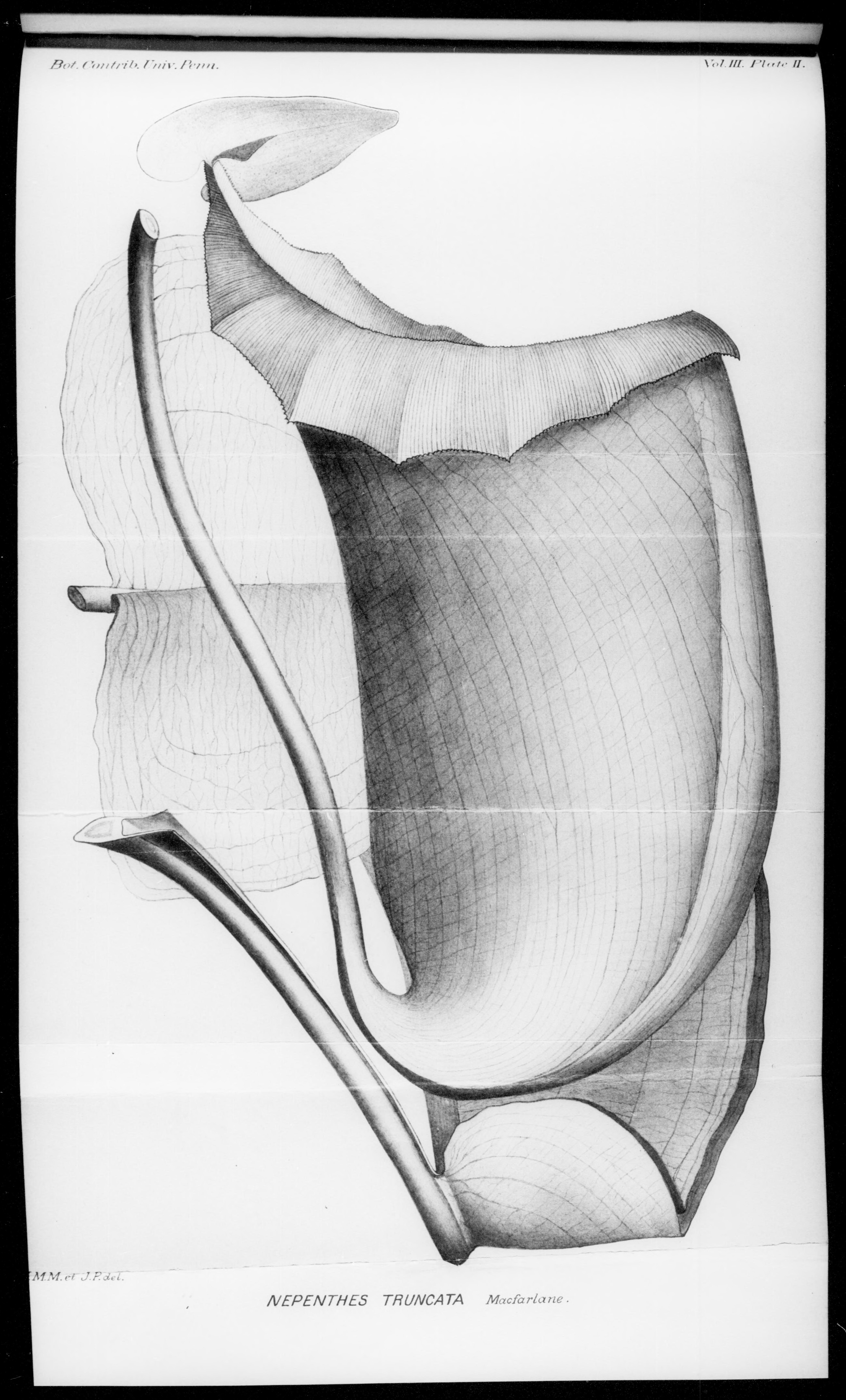
Illustration of N. truncata from Macfarlane's type description of 1911

== Natural hybrids ==
- N. alata × N. truncata [=N. × truncalata]
- N. mindanaoensis × N. truncata
- ? N. petiolata × N. truncata
