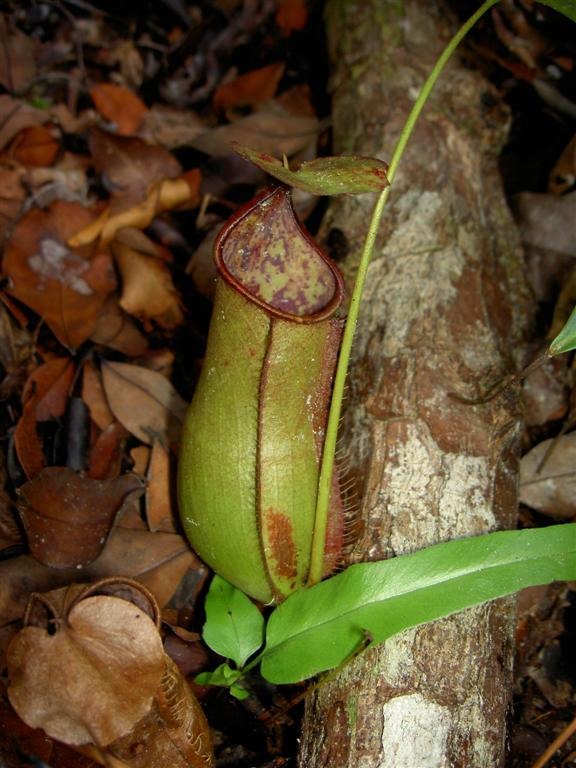
- Lower pitcher of Nepenthes × cantleyi

Scientific classification
- Kingdom: Plantae
- Clade: Tracheophytes
- Clade: Angiosperms
- Clade: Eudicots
- Order: Caryophyllales
- Family: Nepenthaceae
- Genus: Nepenthes
- Species: N. × cantleyi

Binomial name
- Nepenthes × cantleyi Hort.Westphal (1991) nom.nud.

= Nepenthes × cantleyi =

Species of carnivorous plant

Nepenthes × cantleyi (/nɪˈpɛnθiːz kæntˈliːaɪ/; after Rob Cantley) is a natural hybrid involving N. bicalcarata and N. gracilis. It is quite rare outside Brunei, despite its parent species being more widespread throughout Borneo.

The morphology of the pitchers closely resembles N. bicalacarata, although the peristome is more similar to that of N. gracilis. The characteristic spines of N. bicalcarata are greatly reduced and are only present as small bumps. This hybrid has the growth habit of N. gracilis, with the stem scrambling along the ground. It grows in open, sandy areas. The pitcher fluid is notably acidic like that of N. gracilis, with pH values as low as 1.82 being recorded.
