= Betta gladiator =

Conservation status
- Least Concern (IUCN 3.1)

Scientific classification
- Kingdom: Animalia
- Phylum: Chordata
- Class: Actinopterygii
- Division: Teleostei
- Order: Anabantiformes
- Family: Osphronemidae
- Genus: Betta
- Species: B. gladiator

Binomial name
- Betta gladiator H. H. Tan & P. K. L. Ng, 2005

Species of fish

Betta gladiator is a species of gourami endemic to Sabah, Malaysia. It is an inhabitant of the acidic waters of heath forest. It is known as a particularly territorial and aggressive species, especially in captivity. This species grows to a length of 5.6 centimetres (2.2 in) SL and are facultative air-breathers.

== Aquarium Keeping ==
=== Temperament ===
From reports, Betta gladiator is a very aggressive species. Males apparently fight incessantly when housed together and may even kill each other in confined spaces. They're best maintained in pairs, which should be housed in a 55-gallon tank, though it may be necessary to maintain a group temporarily in order for the fish to be able to choose their own partners. Pairs should be given many hiding places. These aggressive fish are not recommended for the standard set-up; their requirements and disposition mean they're best kept alone or with very peaceful species, since much bigger or more vigorous fishes are likely to intimidate and outcompete it. Some small cyprinids and loaches that inhabit similar environments in nature are compatible.

=== Diet ===
The fish are likely to prey on insects and other small invertebrates or zooplankton in nature, plus perhaps the shrimp that share its habitat. Captive fish will normally accept dried products once they're recognized as edible, but should be offered plenty of small live or frozen foods such as Daphnia, bloodworm, brine shrimp, mosquito larvae, bugs, and zooplankton, and brine shrimp regularly to ensure development of optimal color and condition. Large specimens can be offered the occasional earthworm, like in the wild.

=== Breeding and Sex ===
Males have a broader head than females do. Males may have longer extensions of their bottom lips. Females have smaller heads and their ovipositor may protrude slightly from their vent. Females' ovaries might also be visible via spotlighting. One might mistake similar species that would be the unimaculata complex members. Gladiator is a paternal mouthbrooder and the male should incubate from 12 to 18 days with 14 days being very consistent. Incubation time can vary with water temperature. Females normally initiate spawning. Eggs and milt are released in small batches during an 'embrace' typical of osphronemids in which the male wraps his body around that of the female, and there may be several 'dummy' attempts before spawning commences. Both adults have been observed to collect fertilized eggs. Once the male has all the eggs in his mouth, the cycle is repeated until the female is spent of eggs, a process which can take some time. After spawning, it is very important to give the male as much peace and quiet as possible. Males of this species are notorious for swallowing broods of eggs after a few days, and the chances of this happening increase if the male is unduly disturbed. The incubation period appears to be capable of varying tremendously with reports suggesting a range of 14 – 35 days at the end of which the male will begin to release fully formed, free-swimming fry.

=== Color ===
B. gladiator is tan overall with males only exhibiting shiny, bluish scales on the gill covers (opercula) and forward part of the abdomen. No brilliant colors such as red, orange, yellow, beige, and white exist as in Betta splendens.
