= Nepenthes amabilis =

Nepenthes amabilis may refer to:

- Nepenthes amabilis B.S.Williams (1886) — synonym of N. × hookeriana
- Nepenthes amabilis auct. non B.S.Williams: Wistuba, Gronem., Micheler, Marwinski, Gieray, Coritico & V.B.Amoroso (2014) — synonym of N. sumagaya
