= Chresonym =

Term used in biodiversity informatics

In biodiversity informatics, a chresonym is the cited use of an already-existing taxon name, usually a species name, within a publication. The term is derived from the Greek χρῆσις chresis meaning "a use" and refers to published usage of an existing name.

The technical meaning of the related term synonym is for different names that refer to the same object or concept. As noted by Hobart and Rozella B. Smith, zoological systematists had been using "the term (synonymy) in another sense as well, namely in reference to all occurrences of any name or set of names (usually synonyms) in the literature." Such a "synonymy" could include multiple listings, one for each place the author found a name used, rather than a summarized list of different synonyms. The term "chresonym" was created to replace this second sense of the term "synonym." The concept of synonymy is furthermore different in the zoological and botanical codes of nomenclature; under the ICZN, a synonym is an available name (i.e., it has its own description, authorship, date, and type specimens), while a chresonym is not.

A name that correctly refers to a taxon is further termed an orthochresonym while one that is applied incorrectly for a given taxon may be termed a heterochresonym.

== Orthochresonymy ==
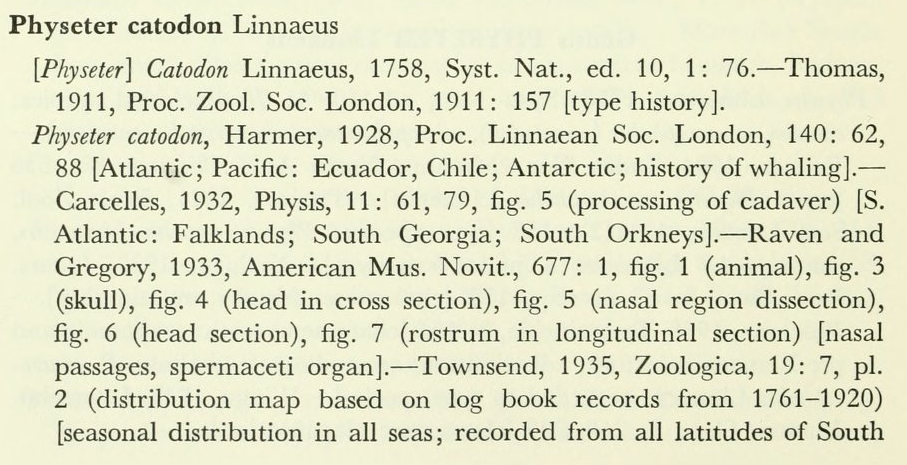
Page 116 in Hershkovitz (1969) showing the chresonym Physeter catodon Harmer 1928

Species names consist of a genus part and a species part to create a binomial name. Species names often also include a reference to the original publication of the name by including the author and sometimes the year of publication of the name. As an example, the sperm whale, Physeter catodon, was first described by Carl Linnaeus in his landmark 1758 10th edition of Systema Naturae. Thus, the name is correctly referenced as Physeter catodon Linnaeus, 1758. That name was also used by Harmer in 1928 to refer to the same species in the Proceedings of the Linnean Society of London and of course, it has appeared in numerous other publications since then. Taxonomic catalogues, such as Catalog of Living Whales by Philip Hershkovitz, may reference this usage with a Genus+species+authorship convention that may superficially appear to indicate a new species description (a homonym) but is instead referencing a particular subsequent usage of an existing species name (a chresonym). Hershkovitz, for example, cites "Physeter catodon, Harmer, 1928", which is the same name that Linnaeus published in 1758, but by convention, the epithets of chresonyms are set off from the author name by a comma (as in Hershkovitz's catalog) or semicolon, to distinguish them from available names.

== Heterochresonymy ==
Nepenthes rafflesiana, a species of pitcher plant, was described by William Jack in 1835. The name Nepenthes rafflesiana as used by Hugh Low in 1848 is a heterochresonym. Cheek and Jebb (2001) explain the situation thus:

Low, ... accidentally, or otherwise, had described what we know as N. rafflesiana as Nepenthes × hookeriana and vice versa in his book "Sarawak, its Inhabitants and Productions" (1848). Masters was the first author to note this in the Gardeners' Chronicle..., where he gives the first full description and illustration of Nepenthes × hookeriana.

The description that Maxwell Tylden Masters provided in 1881 for the taxon that had previously been known to gardeners as Nepenthes hookeriana (an interchangeable form of the name for the hybrid Nepenthes × hookeriana) differs from Low's description. The International Code of Nomenclature for algae, fungi, and plants does not require that descriptions from so long ago include specification of a type specimen, and types can be chosen later to fit these old names. Since the descriptions differ, Low's and Masters' name have different types. Masters therefore created a later homonym, which, according to the rules of the code is illegitimate.

== See also ==
- Biodiversity
- Synonym (taxonomy)
- Glossary of scientific naming
