= Bako National Park =

National park in Malaysia

- IUCN category II (national park)
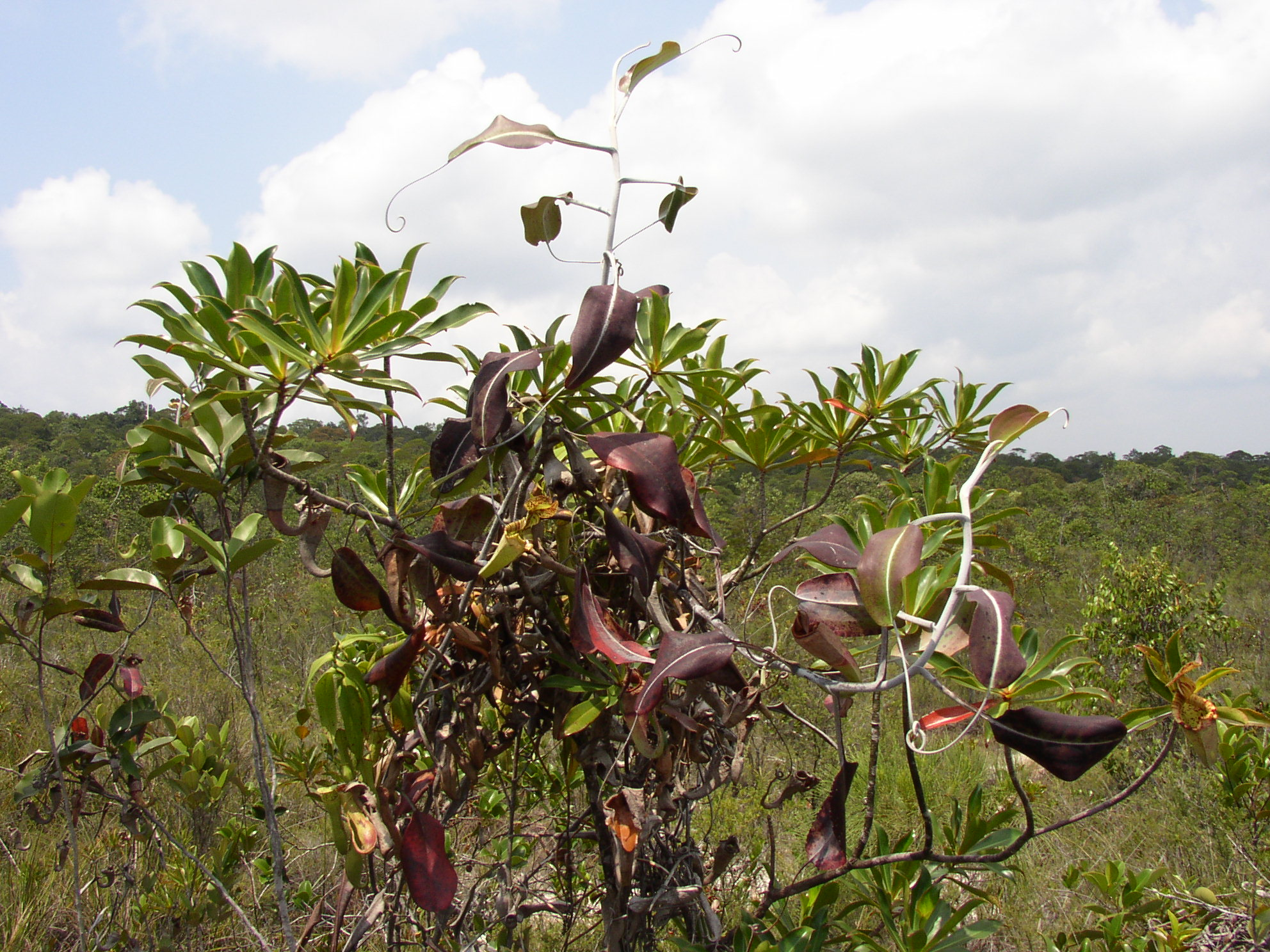
- Padang scrub at Bako National Park, with N. rafflesiana plant in foreground.

- Location within Borneo
- Location: Kuching Division, Sarawak, Malaysia
- Coordinates: 1°43′N 110°28′E
- Area: 27 km^{2} (10 sq mi)
- Established: 1957
- Governing body: Sarawak Forestry

Bako National Park (Malay: Taman Negara Bako) is a national park in Kuching District, Kuching Division, Sarawak, Malaysia. Established in 1957, it is the oldest national park in Sarawak. It covers an area of 27.27 square kilometres (10.53 sq mi) at the tip of the Muara Tebas peninsula at the mouth of the Bako and Kuching Rivers. It is approximately 40 kilometres (25 mi) by road from Kuching. Millions of years of erosion of the sandstone have created a coastline of steep cliffs, rocky headlands and stretches of white, sandy bays. Wave erosion at the base of the cliffs has carved many of the rocky headlands into fantastically shaped sea arches and seastacks with colored patterns formed by iron deposition. The most famous of them was shaped like a cobra's head which could be spotted on a boat ride from the headquarters or one of the beaches. This collapsed in February 2024. Some of these rock formations can be seen on entry to the Teluk Assam Beach, which fronts the park. The park can only be reached by a 20-minute boat ride from the village of Kampung Bako. It is often visited as a day-trip from Kuching, though accommodations (campground and forestry service bungalows) are available.

Bako is one of the smallest national parks in Sarawak. However, it features multiple biomes (including rainforest), abundant wildlife, jungle streams and waterfalls, secluded beaches, and trekking trails. A network of 16 marked walking trails of different lengths allows visitors access. In addition, various beaches are accessible by boat from Kampung Bako or Teluk Assam, as well as a geologically interesting sea stack rock formation. The range of attractions and activities in a compact area have made Bako one of the most popular parks in Sarawak.

The park hosted the final Pit Stop of The Amazing Race Asia 1.

== Flora ==
Bako contains almost every type of plant life found in Borneo, with over 25 distinct types of vegetation from seven complete ecosystems: beach vegetation, cliff vegetation, kerangas or heath forest, mangrove forest, mixed dipterocarp forest, padang or grasslands vegetation and peat swamp forest. The unusual plant life includes a variety of carnivorous plants (four species of pitcher plants, sundews, bladderworts) as well as a huge variety of tree and other plant species.

== Fauna ==
Bako is home to approximately 150 endangered proboscis monkeys, which are endemic to Borneo, and has been called "the best place to see proboscis monkeys in Sarawak". Other animals include the long-tailed macaque, silvered langur, plantain squirrel, Bornean bearded pig, monitor lizards, and otters. All of these are present in the forest as well as near camp headquarters on Telok Assam beach. Bako is also home to a number of lizards and snakes, most of which are harmless. Bako is a fascinating place for bird watching, with over 150 species recorded. Bako's nocturnal creatures include the colugo, pangolin, mousedeer, various species of fruit-eating and insect-eating bats, tarsier, slow loris and palm civet.

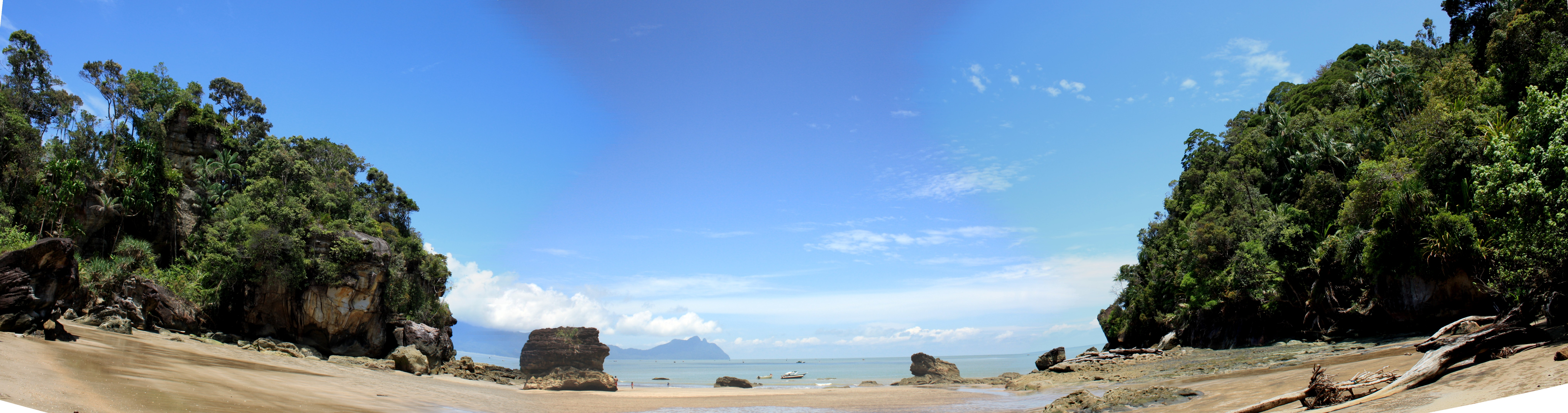
Bako National Park beach panorama

== Gallery ==
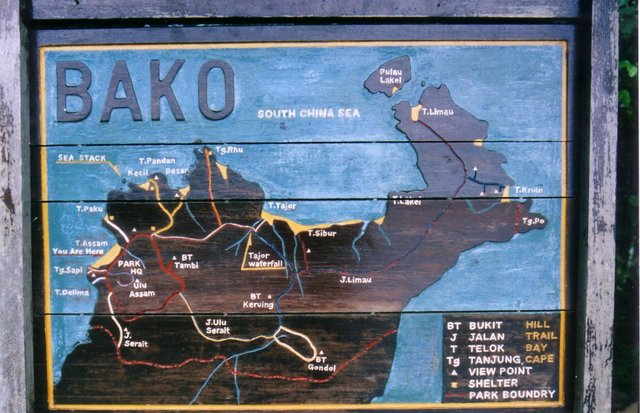
Bako National Park trail map at park headquarters.

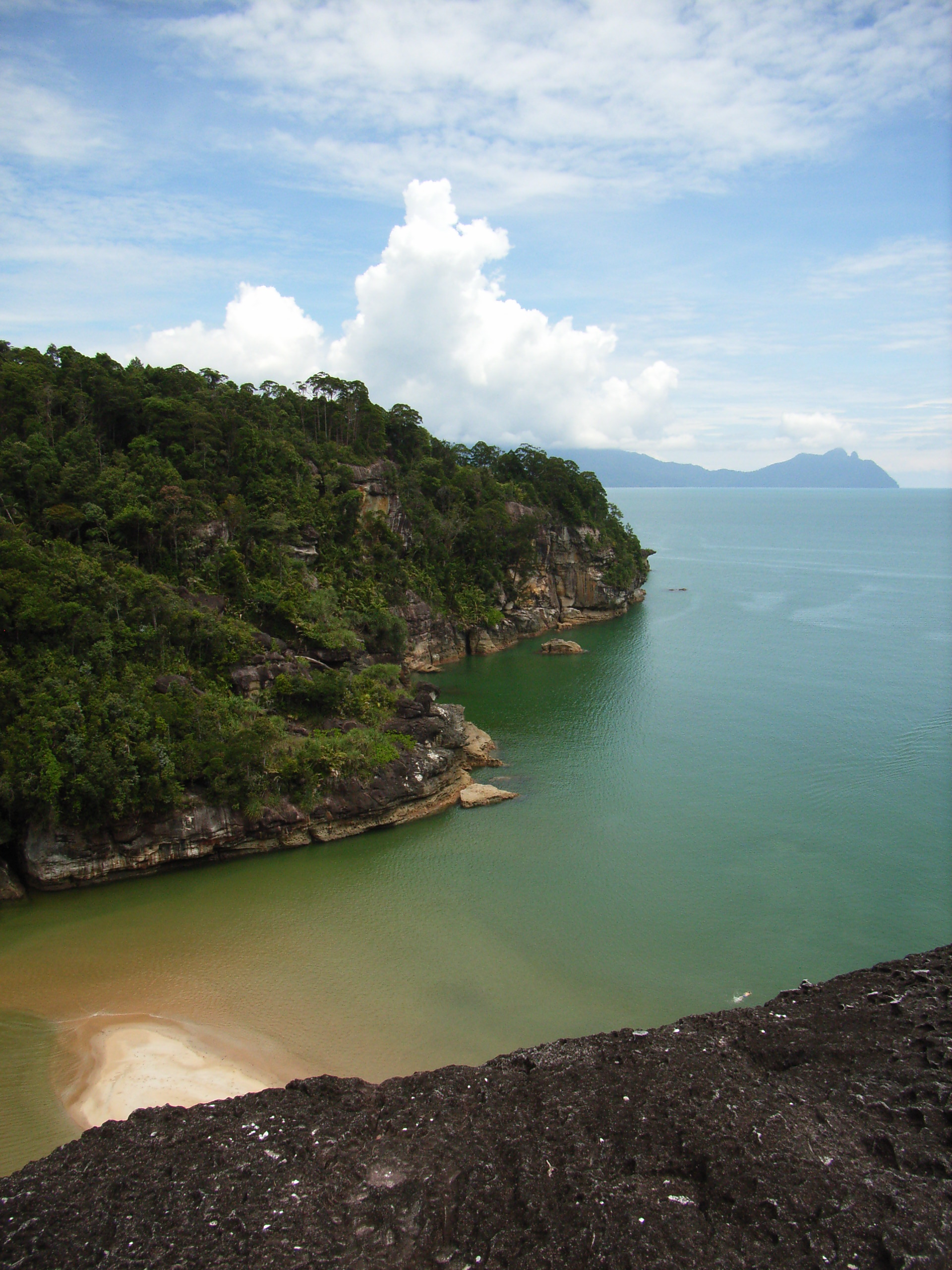
View of Bako National Park

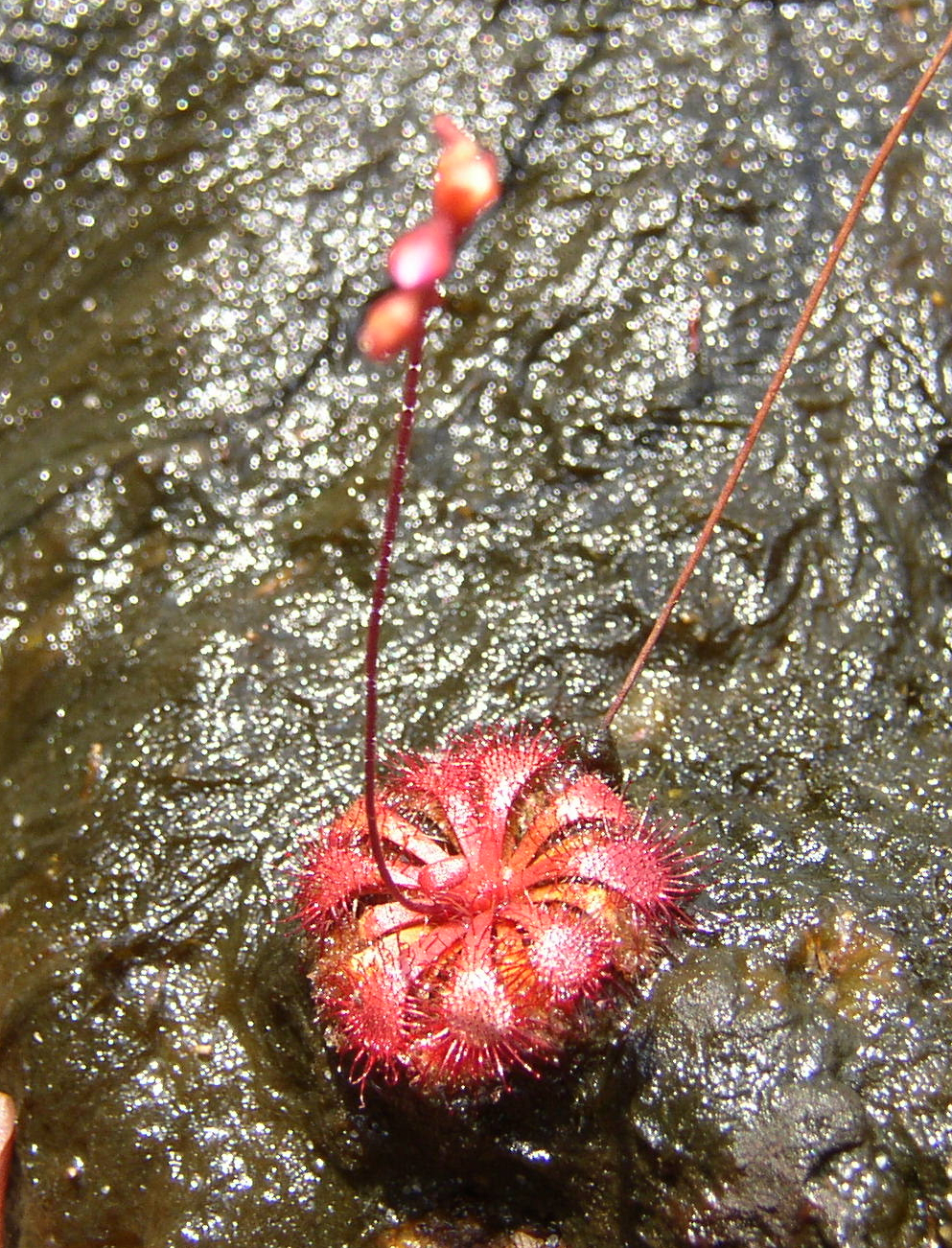
Drosera spatulata var. bakoensis growing at Bako National Park

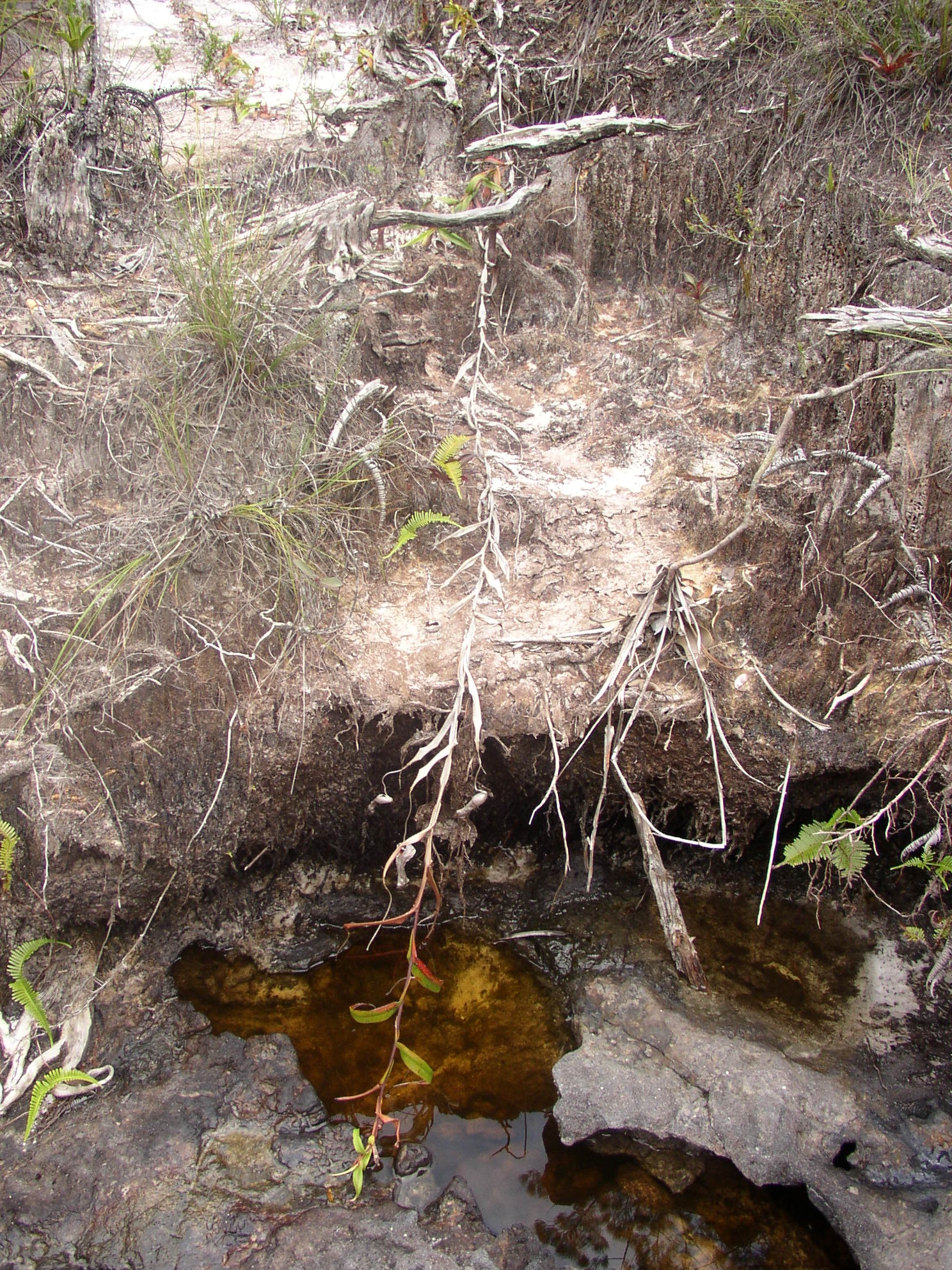
Nepenthes gracilis from Bako National Park

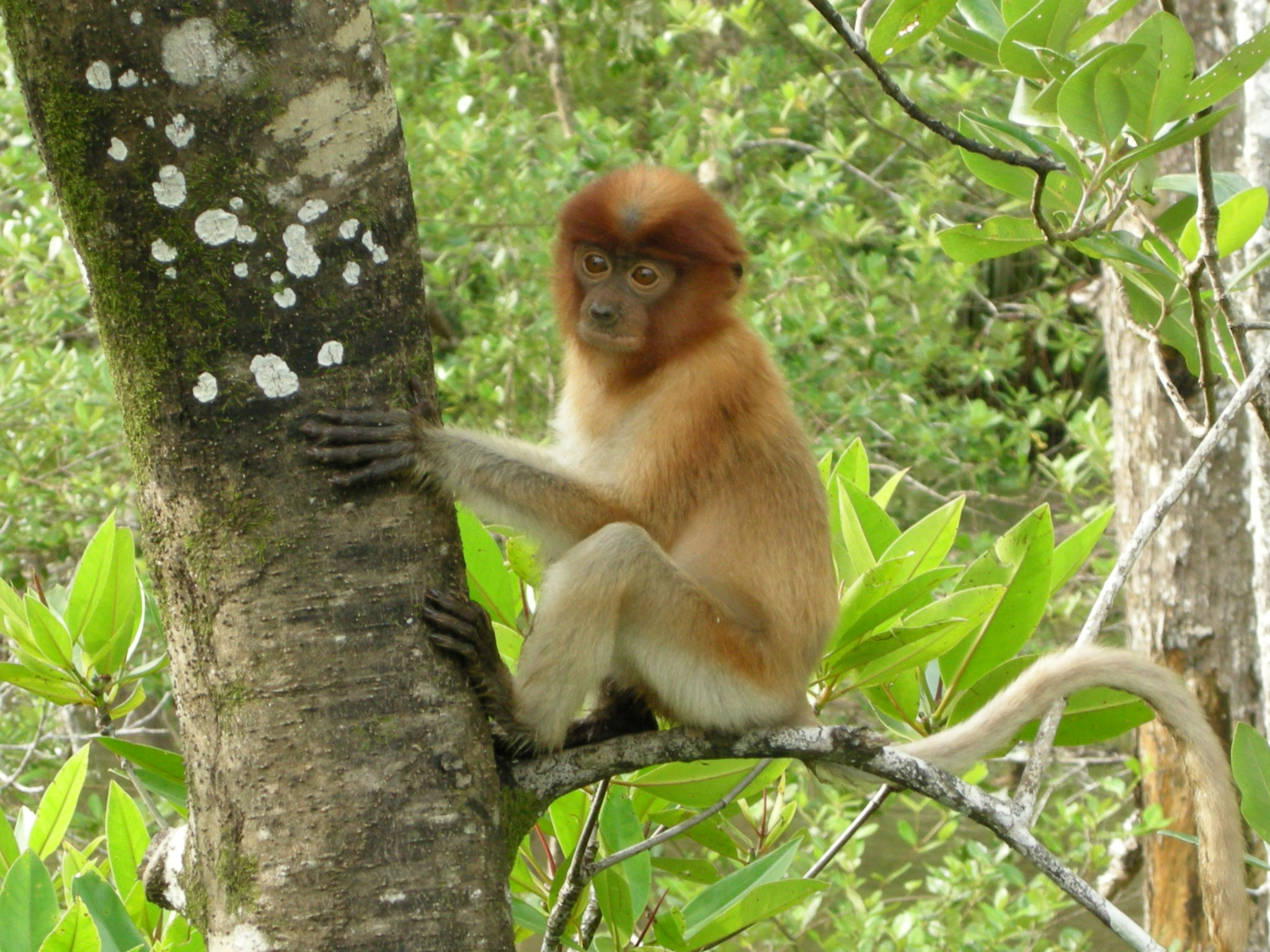
Juvenile proboscis monkey at Bako National Park

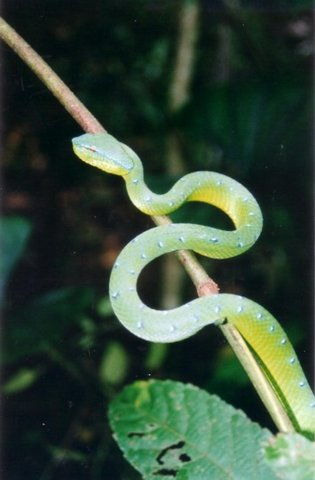
Asian pit viper at Bako National Park

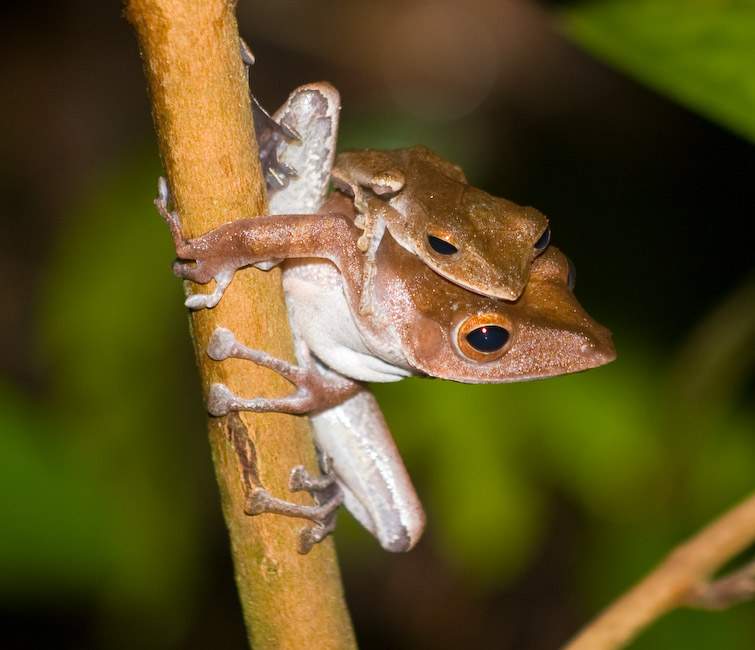
Polypedates colletti at Bako National Park

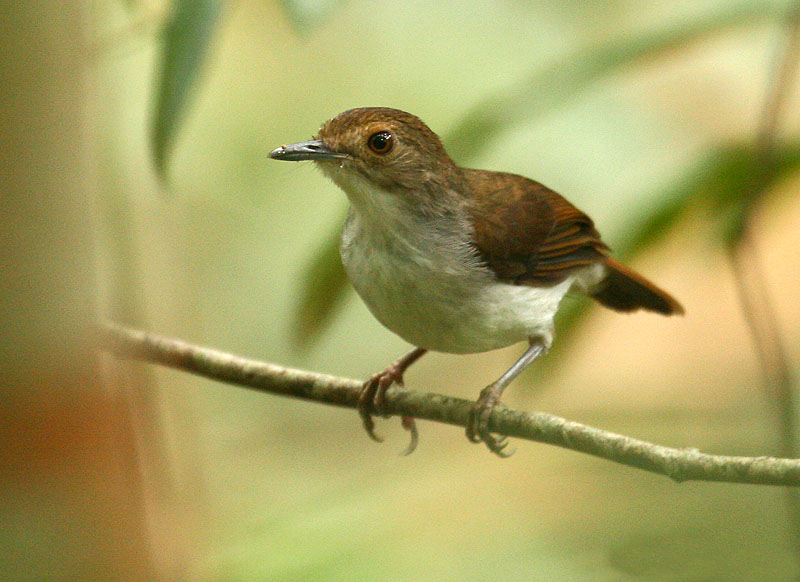
White-chested babbler (Trichastoma rostratum) at Bako National Park

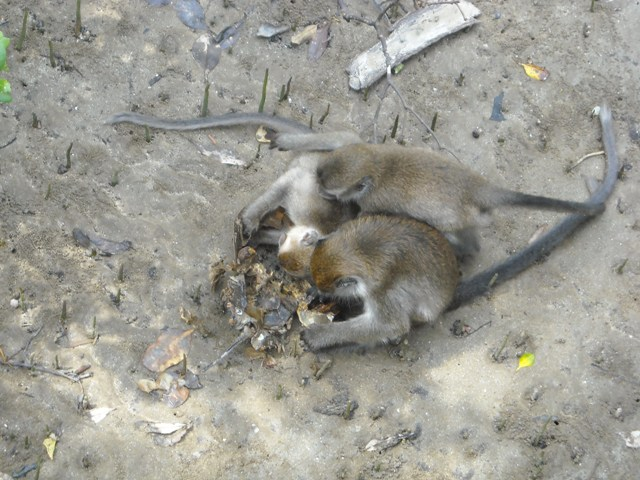
Long-tailed macaques at Bako National Park eating horseshoe crab

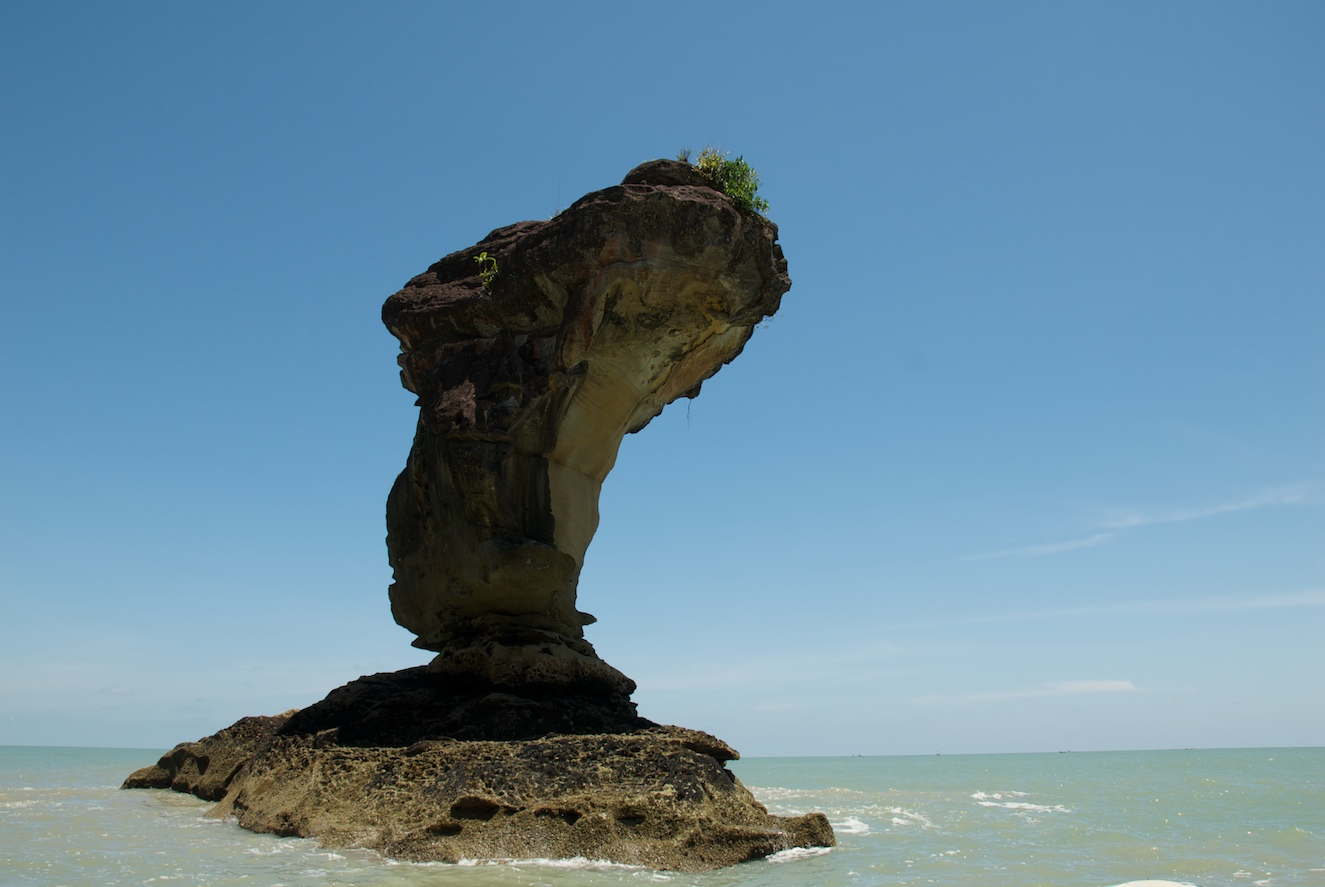
Bako sea stack

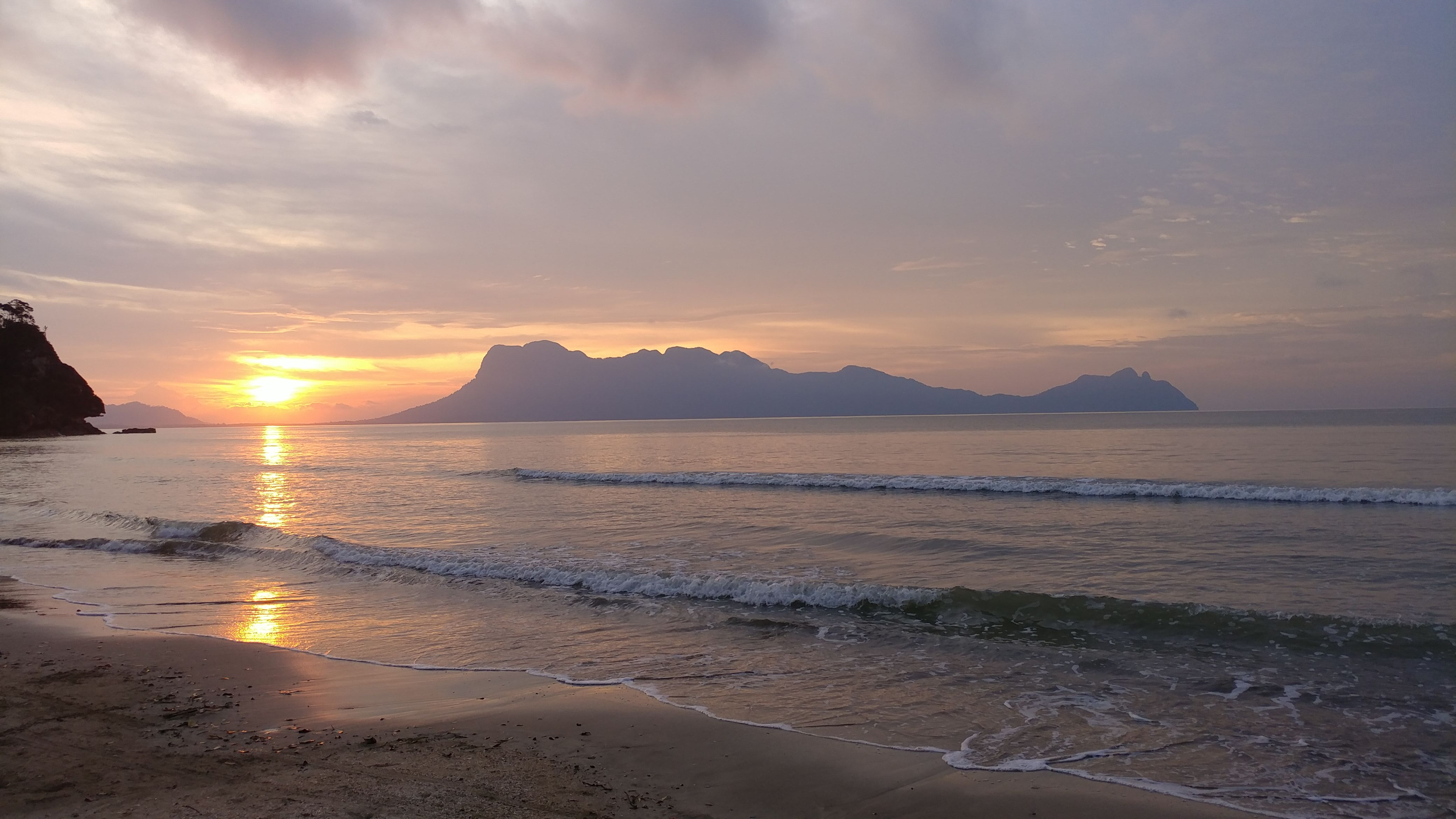
Beach near park HQ

== Video ==
- Short BBC video on Bako National Park
