= Teluk Assam Beach =

Beach in Sarawak, Malaysia

Teluk Assam Beach is a Malaysian beach which fronts Bako National Park. The park can only be accessed by boat from Kuching. The beach features many spectacular rock formations caused by erosion and exhibiting colorful layers showing how it was formed.
