= Marcgravia evenia =

Scientific classification
- Kingdom: Plantae
- Clade: Embryophytes
- Clade: Tracheophytes
- Clade: Spermatophytes
- Clade: Angiosperms
- Clade: Eudicots
- Clade: Asterids
- Order: Ericales
- Family: Marcgraviaceae
- Genus: Marcgravia
- Species: M. evenia

Binomial name
- Marcgravia evenia Krug & Urb.

Species of vine

Marcgravia evenia is a species of flowering vine in the family Marcgraviaceae. Within this family it belongs to the Galetae group, which is characterized by a long inflorescence axis and boat shaped nectaries. The plant is endemic to Cuba. The inflorescence of M. evenia is extraordinary. At the upper end of the pendant inflorescence are several concave bracts set at an angle to reflect and focus sonar pulses from bats, helping the bats to locate the flowers. In the middle of the inflorescence is a discoid circle (or single-whorled umbel) of about twenty tubular tetramerous flowers. Below these is a second set of bracts very different from the reflective ones. These are modified into extrafloral nectaries which is why the bats are interested, and can be enlisted as pollinators. Inflorescences with two different kinds of bracts are quite rare, although the common poinsettia (Euphorbia pulcerima) is one such. M. evenia is the second vine discovered to be acoustically tailored to bats. The first is Mucuna holtonii.

== Bat ecology ==
Marcgravia evenia relies on Monophyllus, a Cuban nectar-feeding bat, for pollination. To feed, the bat must squeeze its face between the down-turned, pollen-rich flowers and the nectar-filled pitcher that handg below. As it hovers, pollen is deposited on its back. This plant has evolved bowl shaped leaves which act as reflectors for a bat's biosonar. This helps the bats to find the plants with greater ease and hence pollinate them with more frequency. The shape of the leaves also helps to guide the bats in locating the hidden feeders. The reflectors are convergent with those of a Bornean pitcher plant, Nepenthes hemsleyana, that attracts bats to its pitchers as roosting sites and uses bat guano as a source of nutrition.
