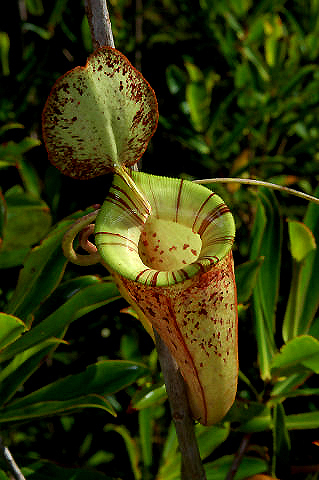
- Upper pitcher of Nepenthes × hookeriana

Conservation status
- Least Concern (IUCN 3.1)

Scientific classification
- Kingdom: Plantae
- Clade: Tracheophytes
- Clade: Angiosperms
- Clade: Eudicots
- Order: Caryophyllales
- Family: Nepenthaceae
- Genus: Nepenthes
- Species: N. × hookeriana

Binomial name
- Nepenthes × hookeriana Hort.Veitch ex Mast. (1881)

Synonyms
- Synonyms: Nepenthes amabilis B.S.Williams (1886) [=(N. rafflesiana × N. ampullaria) × N. rafflesiana]; Nepenthes amesiana Hort.Veitch ex Lindsay (1891) [=N. rafflesiana × (N. rafflesiana × N. ampullaria)]; Nepenthes elongata (Beck) Macfarl. (1908); Nepenthes excelsior Hort.Williams ex W.Robinson (1883) [=N. rafflesiana × (N. rafflesiana × N. ampullaria)]; ?Nepenthes hookeri Hort.Veitch ex C.Turner (1866) [?=N. rafflesiana × N. ampullaria]; Nepenthes loddigesii W.Baxt. (1850); Nepenthes rafflesiana auct. non Jack: Low (1848); Nepenthes rafflesiana auct. non Jack: Hook.f. (1873) [=N. rafflesiana/N. rafflesiana × N. ampullaria]; Nepenthes rafflesiana var. excelsior (Hort.Williams) Beck (1895) [=N. rafflesiana × (N. rafflesiana × N. ampullaria)]; Nepenthes rafflesiana var. hookeriana (auct. non Low: Hort.Veitch ex Mast.) Becc. (1886); Heterochresonyms: Nepenthes hookeriana auct. non Low: Hort. ex Hort.Bednar (1985) [=N. hirsuta × N. rafflesiana]; Nepenthes kookeriana Low ex Becc. (1886) sphalm.typogr. [=N. rafflesiana]; Homonyms: Nepenthes hookeriana Low (1848) nom. nud. [=N. rafflesiana]; Nepenthes hookeriana Lindl. (1848)

= Nepenthes × hookeriana =

Species of pitcher plant from Southeast Asia

Nepenthes × hookeriana (/nɪˈpɛnθiːz ˌhʊkəriˈɑːnə/; after Joseph Dalton Hooker), or Hooker's pitcher-plant, is a common natural hybrid involving N. ampullaria and N. rafflesiana. It was originally described as a species.

It is a relatively common natural hybrid found throughout the lowlands of Borneo, Peninsular Malaysia, Singapore, and Sumatra. It is also present on smaller surrounding islands such as Natuna. Like its parental species, the hybrid generally grows in recently disturbed clearings.

== Infraspecific taxa ==
- Nepenthes hookeri var. elongata Hort.Veitch ex Wilson (1877) sphalm.typogr.
- Nepenthes hookeriana f. elongata (Hort.Veitch ex Wilson) Divers (1879)
