= Heath forest =

Tropical moist forest type

Heath forest is a type of tropical moist forest found in areas with acidic, sandy soils that are extremely nutrient-poor. Notable examples are the Rio Negro campinarana of the Amazon Basin in South America, and the Sundaland heath forests (also known as Kerangas forests) of Borneo and neighboring islands.
