= Nepenthes 'Michael Lee' =

Cultivar of carnivorous plant

- Hybrid parentage: (N. ventricosa × N. alata) × ((N. rafflesiana × N. ampullaria) × (N. gracilis × N. khasiana))
- Cultivar: Nepenthes 'Michael Lee'; Hort.Bednar (1994)
- Origin: B.L.Bednar & O.C.Bramblett, 1986

Nepenthes 'Michael Lee' is a cultivar of a complex manmade hybrid involving N. alata, N. ampullaria, N. gracilis, N. khasiana, N. rafflesiana, and N. ventricosa. It was bred by Bruce Lee Bednar and Orgel Clyde Bramblett in 1986. This cultivar name is not established as it was published without a description, violating Article 24.1 of the International Code of Nomenclature for Cultivated Plants. It first appeared in print in the March 1994 issue of the Carnivorous Plant Newsletter as "x “Michael Lee”".

== See also ==
- List of Nepenthes cultivars
