= Nepenthes 'Alta May' =

Cultivar of carnivorous plant

- Hybrid parentage: N. distillatoria × N. ventricosa
- Cultivar: Nepenthes 'Alta May'; Hort.Bednar (1994)
- Origin: B.L.Bednar & O.C.Bramblett, 1989

Nepenthes 'Alta May' is a cultivar of a manmade hybrid between N. distillatoria and N. ventricosa. It was bred by Bruce Lee Bednar and Orgel Clyde Bramblett in 1989. This cultivar name is not established as it was published without a description, violating Article 24.1 of the International Code of Nomenclature for Cultivated Plants. It is a synonym of N. × butcheri and was originally published in the March 1994 issue of the Carnivorous Plant Newsletter as "x butcherii var. “Alta May”". Bednar and Bramblett listed its parentage as "distillatoria rubra x ventricosa (pink)".

== See also ==
- List of Nepenthes cultivars
