= + Laburnocytisus 'Adamii' =

Species of tree

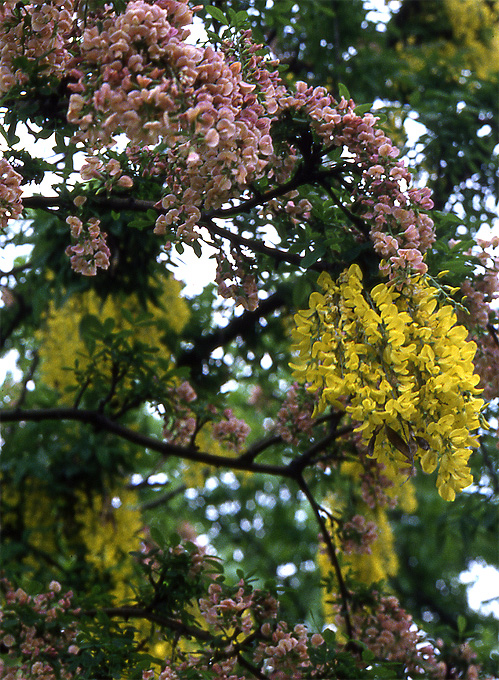
- + Laburnocytisus 'Adamii' has flowers typical of both laburnum and broom
- Genus: + Laburnocytisus
- Cultivar: 'Adamii'

+ Laburnocytisus 'Adamii' (also known as Adam's laburnum or broom laburnum) is a horticultural curiosity; a small tree which is a graft-chimaera between two species, a laburnum, Laburnum anagyroides, and a broom, Chamaecytisus purpureus (syn. Cytisus purpureus), which bears some shoots typical of the one species, some of the other, and some which are a peculiar mixture of both "parents". The plus sign (+) indicates the generic name is made for a graft-chimaera. The plant can also be described by the formula Laburnum anagyroides + Chamaecytisus purpureus.

+ Laburnocytisus 'Adamii' is a legume, a member of the pea family Faboideae (or Papilionaceae, formerly Leguminosae). Only one cultivar, 'Adamii' is known to have arisen from this graft. It is sometimes described as if it were one species, (+ )Laburnocytisus adamii; however, it is not one species and this notation is not conforming to International Code of Nomenclature for Cultivated Plants.

== Appearance ==
Most of the tree's branches resemble the laburnum in their foliage, which has three leaflets (3-palmate) and 3–6 cm long, yet also with dense clusters of broom-like shoots, also with three leaflets, but only 1 cm long and a darker green. It flowers in late spring or early summer; some branches have long (20–30 cm) racemes of yellow laburnum flowers, while others produce dense clusters of purple broom flowers. Remarkably, most branches will also produce coppery-pink flowers on short (8–15 cm) racemes, which are midway between the two "parents"; the leaves on these shoots are also intermediate. In older specimens, the proportion of broom and mixed tissues tends to decline, and the laburnum to predominate. The tree grows to a height of 7 m (rarely 8 m) and is hardy to USDA plant hardiness zone 5 in northern Europe. It requires moderately fertile, moist but well-drained soil and should be grown in a sunny position to flower well.

== Origin ==
The plant originated in the nursery of M. Adam near Paris in 1825, probably as an accident; Chamaecytisus purpureus is normally a low-growing plant, and grafting it onto a straight trunk of a related species would be expected to create an attractive, semi-weeping standard.

In theory, other + Laburnocytisus could be developed in the same way but using different "parents".

== Structure ==
A graft-chimaera is not a true hybrid but a mixture of cells, each with the genotype of one of its "parents"; it is a chimaera, created by grafting, in which the tissue of one plant grows within an outer envelope of the second plant. In the case of + Laburnocytisus 'Adamii', laburnum forms the core, surrounded by the broom. Such plants are often called "graft hybrids", but as they are not true hybrids the use of this term is now discouraged.

== Other graft-chimaeras ==
+ Crataegomespilus is a graft-chimera between hawthorn (Crataegus) and medlar (Mespilus) which arose in a similar manner. There are two distinct cultivars that have arisen from this graft: + Crataegomespilus 'Dardarii' and + Crataegomespilus 'Jules d'Asnieres'.

The Bizzarria of Florence (Citrus medica + C. aurantium), which is probably the first graft chimera obtained, is a graft between the Florentine citron and sour orange.
