= Lucien Louis Daniel =

French botanist (1856–1940)

- Born: 1 November 1856; La Dorée, Mayenne, France
- Died: 26 December 1940 (aged 84); Rennes, Ille-et-Vilaine, France
- Known for: Studies of grafting and graft hybridization
- Scientific career
- Fields: Botany, horticulture
- Workplaces: Faculty of Sciences of Rennes
- Author abbrev. (botany): L.L.Daniel

Lucien Louis Daniel (1 November 1856 – 26 December 1940) was a French botanist and horticulturist who spent most of his career at the Faculty of Sciences of Rennes studying grafting. He is best remembered for his contested claim that grafting could produce lasting, heritable change in plants, a position he reached in the same years as the Russian breeder Ivan Michurin and that links his name to the long debate over so-called graft hybrids. He has sometimes been described as a founder of scientific horticulture.

== Early life and education ==
Daniel was born on 1 November 1856 at the farm of La Bigottière, in the commune of La Dorée in the Mayenne, to Romain Daniel and Anne Guilloux. His father farmed and made cider, and had worked out his own method of propagating apple trees, an early acquaintance with plant cultivation that Daniel later traced his interests back to.

He prepared for the brevet élémentaire at the school in Lassay, breaking off his studies during the Franco-Prussian War to work on the family land. In 1876 he entered the École normale primaire at Laval, qualified as a schoolteacher, and went on to take a licence, finishing top of his year. A doctorate in natural sciences followed in 1890, with a thesis on the anatomy and physiology of the bracts of the Compositae.

== Career ==
In 1895 Daniel became professor and maître de conférences at the Faculty of Sciences of Rennes, where botany was paired with practical work in horticulture and arboriculture. His research had turned to grafting in the autumn of 1890, and it held his attention for the rest of his life: he published steadily on the subject from the early 1890s until his death in 1940. He founded the Société bretonne de botanique and edited the Revue bretonne de botanique pure et appliquée.

== Research on grafting and heredity ==
Daniel was among the first to study grafting on a large scale and by experiment rather than by gardeners' rule of thumb. Across many trials he recorded shoots that, after grafting, seemed to carry features of both the stock and the scion, in their form, their physiology or the chemistry of their tissues, and he argued that such blends could pass to later generations. These claimed graft hybrids, which he also called "asexual hybrids", aligned him with the older view that characters acquired through the union of stock and scion could be inherited, and his name came to be set beside those of Ivan Michurin and Luther Burbank.

One of his examples entered botanical literature in its own right. From a grafted plant raised about 1902 in a garden at Rennes, a pear, Pyrus communis 'Williams' Bon Chrétien', cut back over a quince Cydonia oblonga stock, shoots appeared that combined the two. The resulting graft-chimaera, now usually written + Pyrocydonia danielii, was named after Daniel. A second form that he raised in 1913 he named winkleri for the German botanist Hans Winkler.

Daniel's conclusions did not survive the rise of genetics. After the rediscovery of Mendel's laws in 1900, which placed heredity in the sex cells and rejected the inheritance of acquired characteristics, many geneticists doubted that true graft hybrids existed at all. Historians of the subject treat his experiments as one chapter in a dispute that ran for decades and acquired a political edge in the mid-20th century, when Soviet biology under Trofim Lysenko enlisted graft hybridization against Western genetics.

== Viticulture and the phylloxera crisis ==
Though he worked far from the main wine regions, Daniel became a prominent and awkward voice in the argument over how to rebuild France's vineyards after the phylloxera crisis. He was sceptical of the accepted cure, grafting European vines onto resistant American rootstocks, holding that the graft changed the vine and the character of its wine. The stance set him against the dominant "Americanist" camp and cost him dearly in professional standing. On his own ground he tried to acclimatize the vine north of the Loire and to push its cultivation in Brittany beyond its old limits.

== Honours ==
Daniel received the Veitch Memorial Medal of the Royal Horticultural Society in 1904, gold medals from the Académie d'Agriculture and the Société d'Horticulture de France, and the Prix Philippeaux of the Académie des Sciences. He was made an Officer of the Legion of Honour in 1937, the year his work was shown at the Palais de la Découverte in Paris during the International Exposition.

== Death and legacy ==
Daniel's son Jean, born in 1887, helped him with work on plant ecology before being killed in the Champagne fighting in 1915. Daniel died at Rennes on 26 December 1940 and was buried at Erquy in the Côtes-d'Armor, where he had owned a villa. Streets were later named for him at Laval and Rennes, and a housing estate carries his name in his native La Dorée.

== Selected publications ==
- (1890) Recherches anatomiques et physiologiques sur les bractées de l'involucre des Composées (doctoral thesis)
- (1902) La Théorie des Capacités Fonctionnelles et ses Conséquences en Agriculture
- (1904) Premières Notes sur la Reconstitution du Vignoble Français par le Greffage
- (1908) La Question phylloxérique: Le Greffage et la Crise Viticole
- (c. 1911) L'Hérédité chez le Haricot Vivace
- (1925) Nouvelles Observations sur les Hybrides de Greffe et l'Hérédité chez les Plantes Greffées
- (1925) Les Plantes médicinales en Bretagne
- (1929) La Culture de la Vigne en Bretagne: Son Histoire, son État Actuel et son Avenir
- (1940) Les Mystères de l'Hérédité Symbiotique
