= Nepenthes 'Kalamity' =

Cultivar of carnivorous plant

- Hybrid parentage: ("N. anamensis" × N. ventricosa) × ((N. rafflesiana × N. ampullaria) × (N. gracilis × N. khasiana))
- Cultivar: Nepenthes 'Kalamity'; Hort.Bednar (1994)
- Origin: B.L.Bednar & O.C.Bramblett, 1988

Nepenthes 'Kalamity' is a cultivar of a complex manmade hybrid involving N. ampullaria, N. gracilis, N. khasiana, N. rafflesiana, N. ventricosa, and a plant identified as N. anamensis.^{[note a]} It was bred by Bruce Lee Bednar and Orgel Clyde Bramblett in 1988. This cultivar name is not established as it was published without a description, violating Article 24.1 of the International Code of Nomenclature for Cultivated Plants. It first appeared in print in the March 1994 issue of the Carnivorous Plant Newsletter as "x kalamity".

== See also ==
- List of Nepenthes cultivars

== Notes ==
a. Nepenthes anamensis is now considered a heterotypic synonym of N. smilesii, but, like other Indochinese species of the "N. thorelii aggregate", it was the subject of considerable horticultural confusion in the past.
