= + Pyrocrataegus =

Scientific classification (disputed)
- Kingdom: Plantae
- Clade: Tracheophytes
- Clade: Angiosperms
- Clade: Eudicots
- Clade: Rosids
- Order: Rosales
- Family: Rosaceae
- Tribe: Maleae
- Subtribe: Malinae
- Genus: + Pyrocrataegus; Rehder
- Species: + P. willei

Binomial name
- + Pyrocrataegus willei L.L. Daniel

Synonyms
- + Pirocrataegus L.L.Daniel

Genus of flowering plants in the rose family Rosaceae

+ Pyrocrataegus is an artificial hybrid genus in the family Rosaceae involving the genera Crataegus and Pyrus with an unclear taxonomic status. It is mostly believed to be a graft-chimaera, but could possibly be a sexual hybrid instead.

== Description ==
The foliage, flowers, and fruits resemble those of the genus Pyrus. The inflorescence is corymbose. The small, red, pyriform fruit is 1.5–3 cm long.

== Taxonomy ==
It was first described as + Pirocrataegus L.L.Daniel by Lucien Louis Daniel in 1915, but this description may be a Nomen nudum. It was described a second time as + Pyrocrataegus Rehder by Alfred Rehder in 1927. The correct genus authority is unclear. Some sources credit Lucien Louis Daniel, while others credit Alfred Rehder as the taxon author. It is an artificial hybrid genus involving Crataegus and Pyrus. Some sources treat it as an "unplaced name". Its status is somewhat uncertain: Some treat it as a genus of graft-chimaera, some as a nothogenus, and some sources simply list it as a genus. This intergeneric hybrid between Pyrus and Crataegus is yet to be confirmed by modern taxonomical methods.

Its only species Pyrocrataegus willei L.L. Daniel was described by Lucien Louis Daniel in 1915.

=== Etymology ===
The generic name Pyrocrataegus combines the genera Pyrus and Crataegus.
