= Nepenthes 'LeeAnn Marie' =

Cultivar of carnivorous plant

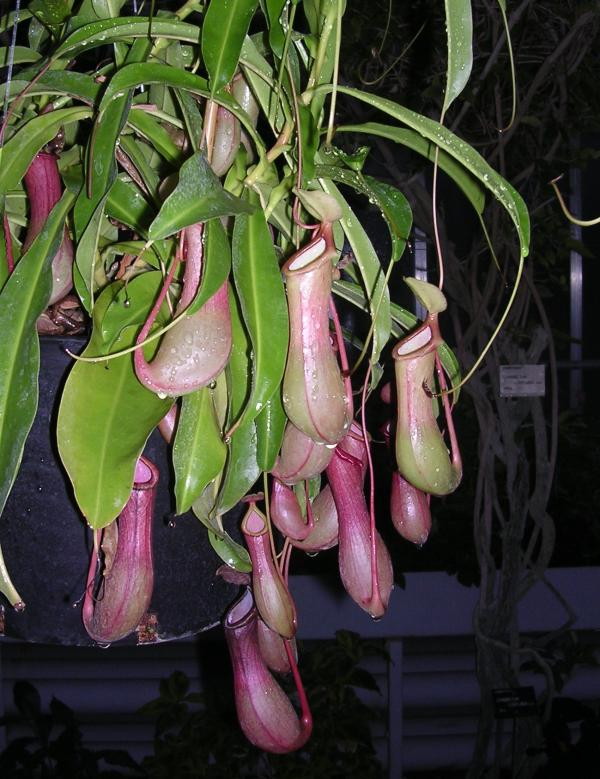
- Nepenthes (pitcher plant)
- Hybrid parentage: N. ventricosa × (N. ventricosa × N. alata)
- Cultivar: Nepenthes 'LeeAnn Marie'; Hort.Bednar (1994)
- Origin: B.L.Bednar, 1982

Nepenthes 'LeeAnn Marie' is a cultivar of a manmade hybrid involving N. alata and N. ventricosa. It was bred by Bruce Lee Bednar in 1982. This cultivar name is not established as it was published without a description, violating Article 24.1 of the International Code of Nomenclature for Cultivated Plants. It is a later synonym of N. × ventrata and first appeared in print in the March 1994 issue of the Carnivorous Plant Newsletter as "x “LeeAnn Marie”". Bednar and Bramblett listed its parentage as "ventricosa (green form) x ventrata G".

== See also ==
- List of Nepenthes cultivars
