= International Code of Nomenclature =

International Code of Nomenclature may refer to:

- International Code of Nomenclature for algae, fungi, and plants (ICN), formerly the International Code of Botanical Nomenclature (ICBN)
- International Code of Nomenclature of Bacteria (ICNB)
- International Code of Nomenclature for Cultivated Plants (ICNCP)

== See also ==
- International Code of Phytosociological Nomenclature (ICPN)
- International Code of Zoological Nomenclature (ICZN)
- The nomenclature code of the International Committee on Taxonomy of Viruses (ICTV code)
