= Nepenthes 'Ted Payne' =

Cultivar of carnivorous plant

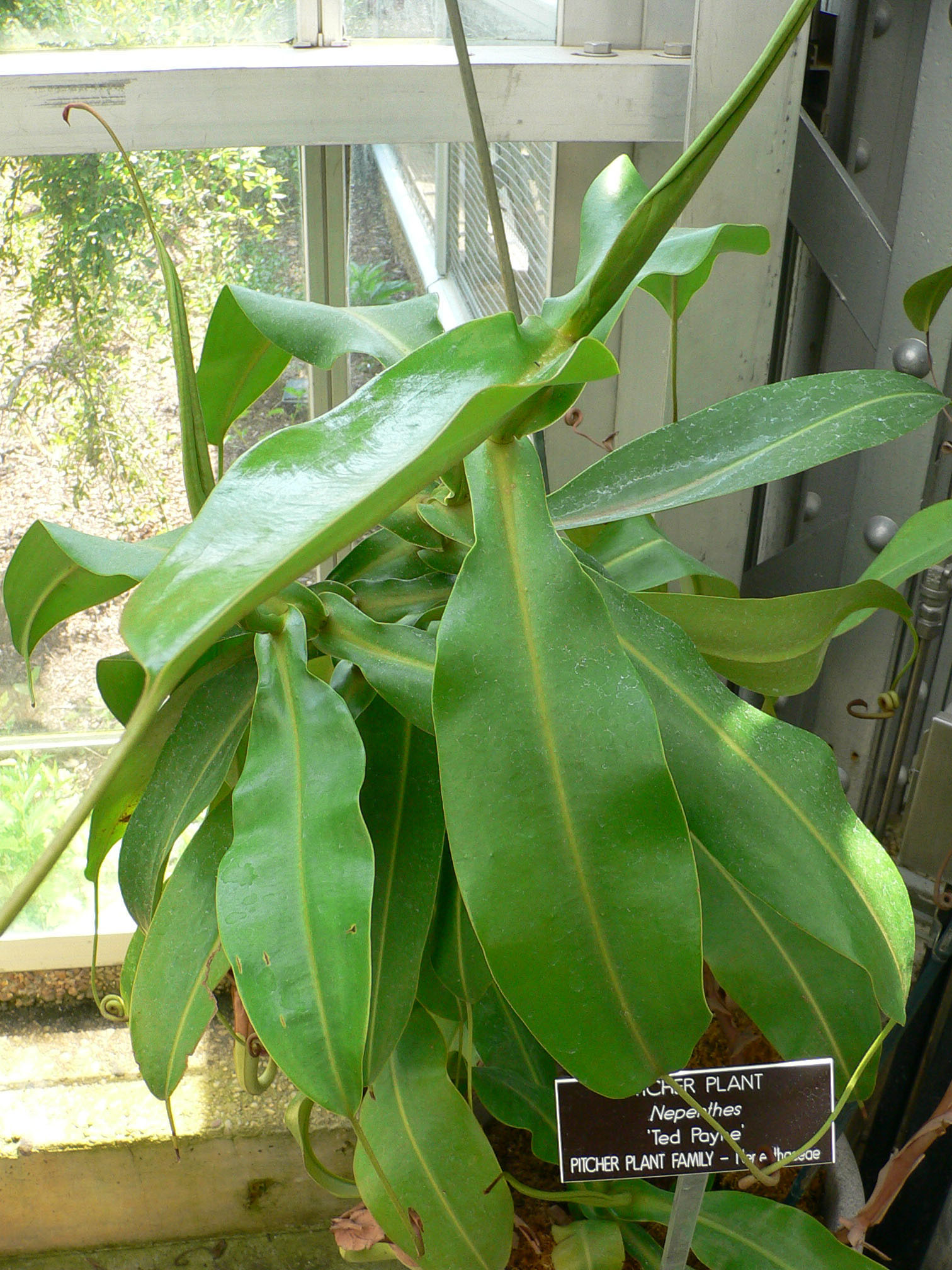
- Hybrid parentage: (N. northiana × N. maxima) × N. maxima
- Cultivar: Nepenthes 'Ted Payne'; Hort. ex Hort.Bednar (1994)

Nepenthes 'Ted Payne' is a cultivar of a manmade hybrid involving N. maxima and N. northiana. This cultivar name is not established as it was published without a description, violating Article 24.1 of the International Code of Nomenclature for Cultivated Plants. It is a later synonym of N. × mixta.

In 1987, Bruce Lee Bednar and Orgel Clyde Bramblett crossed a male N. 'Ted Payne' with a female N. mirabilis. This hybrid was one of the few Bednar and Bramblett crosses of the time to not be named. The cultivar name 'Ted Payne' first appeared in print in the March 1994 issue of the Carnivorous Plant Newsletter as part of this cross; it was listed as "mirabilis x Ted Payne".

== See also ==
- List of Nepenthes cultivars
