= Imeni Michurina =

Imeni Michurina (Russian: и́мени Мичу́рина) is the name of several rural localities in Russia:

- Imeni Michurina, Republic of Dagestan, a selo in Derbentsky District of the Republic of Dagestan
- Imeni Michurina, Republic of Tatarstan, a settlement in Leninogorsky District of the Republic of Tatarstan

== See also ==
- Michurin (disambiguation)
- Michurina (rural locality)
