= Nepenthes 'Amy Michelle' =

Cultivar of carnivorous plant

- Hybrid parentage: "N. thorelii" × N. rafflesiana
- Cultivar: Nepenthes 'Amy Michelle'; Hort.Bednar (1994)
- Origin: B.L.Bednar & O.C.Bramblett, 1989

Nepenthes 'Amy Michelle' is a cultivar of a manmade hybrid between N. rafflesiana and a plant identified as N. thorelii.^{[note a]} It was bred by Bruce Lee Bednar and Orgel Clyde Bramblett in 1989. This cultivar name is not established as it was published without a description, violating Article 24.1 of the International Code of Nomenclature for Cultivated Plants. It is a later synonym of N. 'Delectable Koto'. The cultivar name 'Amy Michelle' first appeared in print in the March 1994 issue of the Carnivorous Plant Newsletter as "x “Amy Michelle”". Bednar and Bramblett listed its parentage as "thorelii x rafflesiana nivea".

== See also ==
- List of Nepenthes cultivars

== Notes ==
a. Nepenthes thorelii is a poorly known Indochinese species with a confused horticultural history. The name has been widely applied to cultivated plants, but it is not certain whether the species exists in cultivation at all. Numerous artificial hybrids long thought to involve N. thorelii likely represent crosses with other Indochinese species of the "N. thorelii aggregate"—particularly N. bokorensis, N. kampotiana, and N. smilesii, as these were the most accessible to plant collectors—or hybrids thereof.
