= Michurin =

Michurin (masculine) or Michurina (feminine) may refer to:

== People ==
- Ivan Fyodorovich Michurin (1700–1763), Russian architect
- Ivan Michurin (biologist) (1855–1935), Soviet plant breeder
- Olga Michurina, Russian runner who set a world record at the 10,000 meter women indoor event

== Places ==
- Michurin, Tajikistan, a village in Tajikistan
- Michurina (rural locality), name of several rural localities in Russia

== Other ==
- Michurin (film) (1948), a Soviet film about the plant breeder
