= Nepenthes 'Miranda' =

Cultivar of carnivorous plant

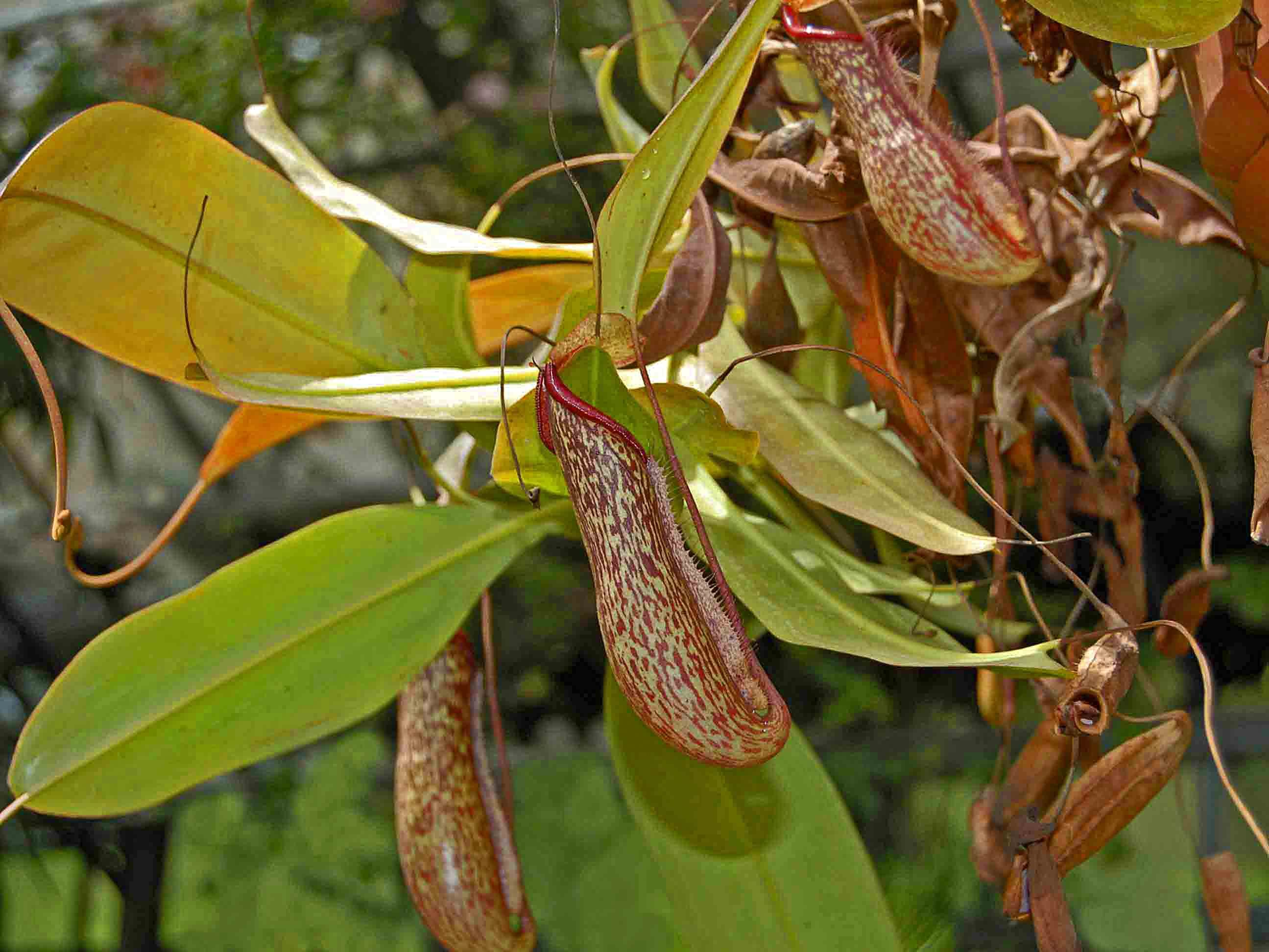
- Nepenthes 'Miranda' at Orto Botanico dell'Università di Genova
- Hybrid parentage: ((N. maxima × N. northiana) × N. maxima)
- Cultivar: Nepenthes 'Miranda'

Nepenthes 'Miranda' is a cultivar of a manmade hybrid involving N. maxima and N. northiana. For some authors it is a more complex hybrid.

== Description ==
This perennial carnivorous tropical plant is classified as a Lowland, Intermediate, and sometimes even Highland, due to its Highland and Lowland ancestry. It produces peculiar pale green pitchers with red-brown speckles and an almost vertical mouth with a dark reddish-brown peristome. The pitchers of this plant can reach heights of up to 25–30 centimetres (9.8–11.8 in).

== See also ==
- List of Nepenthes cultivars
