= Nepenthes phyllamphora (disambiguation) =

Nepenthes phyllamphora may refer to:

- Nepenthes phyllamphora Willd. (1805) — synonym of N. mirabilis
- Nepenthes phyllamphora auct. non Willd.: Sims (1826) — synonym of N. khasiana
- Nepenthes phyllamphora auct. non Willd.: Reinw. ex Miq. (1858) — synonym of N. gymnamphora
- Nepenthes phyllamphora auct. non Willd.: Regel (1881) — pro parte synonym of N. khasiana and N. mirabilis
- Nepenthes phyllamphora auct. non Willd.: Stapf (1894) — synonym of N. burbidgeae
- Nepenthes phyllamphora var. macrantha Hook.f. (1873) — synonym of N. mirabilis
- Nepenthes phyllamphora var. pediculata Lecomte (1909) — synonym of N. mirabilis
- Nepenthes phyllamphora var. platyphylla Blume (1852) — synonym of N. mirabilis
- Nepenthes phyllamphora var. speciosa Hort.Van Houtte ex Rafarin (1869) — synonym of N. mirabilis
