= Nepenthes rubra =

Nepenthes rubra may refer to:

- Nepenthes rubra Hort.Van Houtte ex Rafarin (1869) — synonym of N. khasiana
- Nepenthes rubra auct. non Hort.Van Houtte ex Rafarin: Nichols. (1886) — synonym of N. distillatoria
