= List of Nepenthes cultivars =

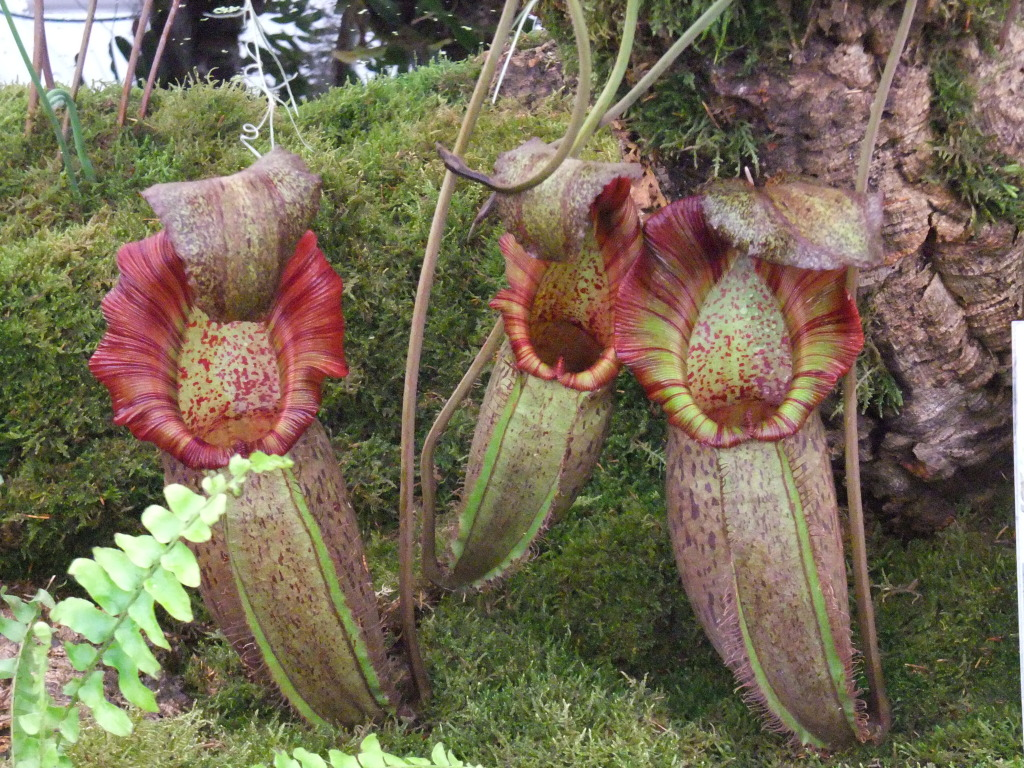
Nepenthes 'Helen' from the Borneo Exotics display at the 2011 Chelsea Flower Show

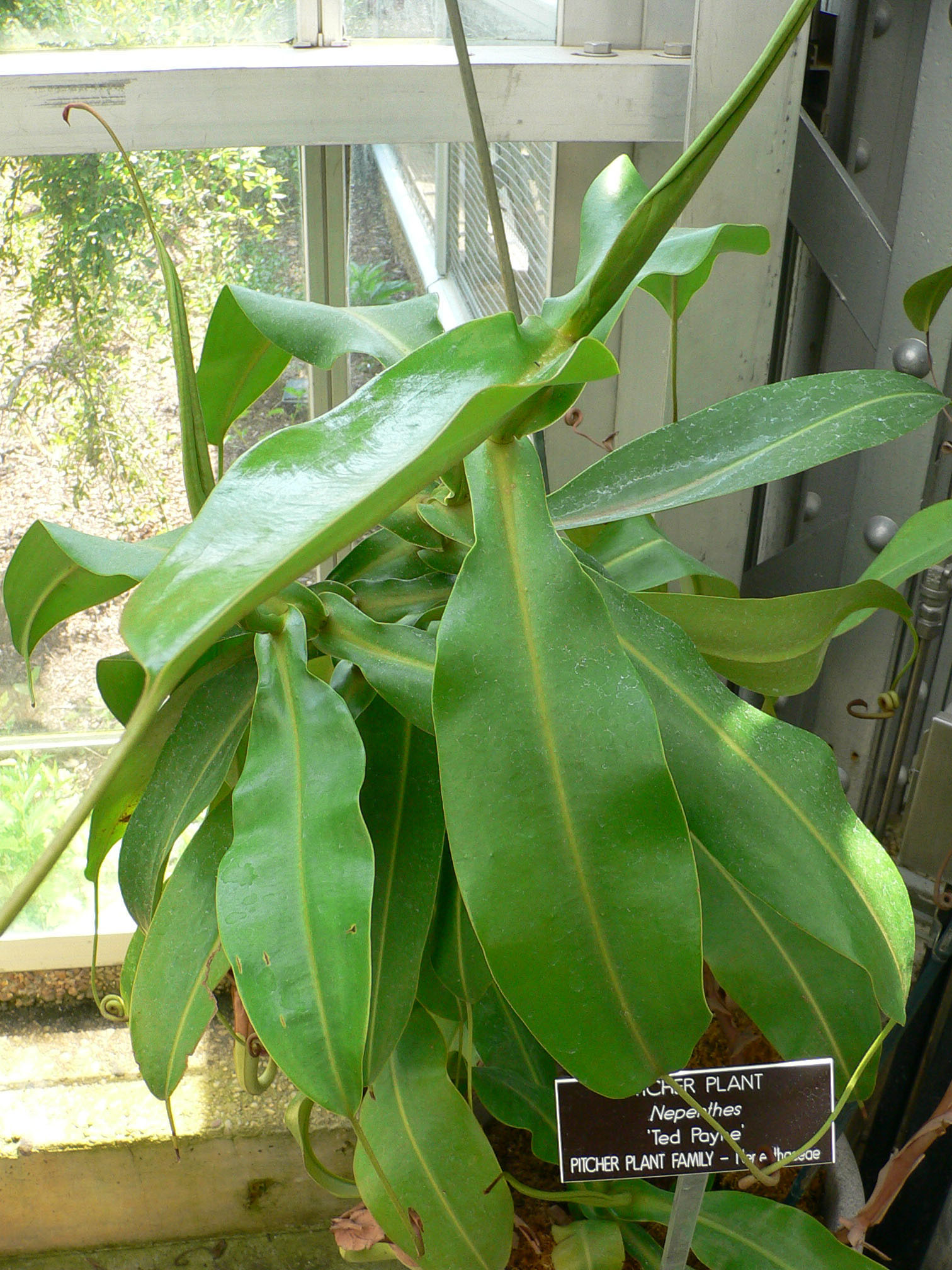
Nepenthes 'Ted Payne'

241 cultivars of the carnivorous plant genus Nepenthes are included in the International Carnivorous Plant Society (ICPS)'s official list. This is by far the greatest number of cultivars of any carnivorous plant genus.

The ICPS has been the International Registration Authority (IRA) for carnivorous plant cultivars since 1998.

The year in brackets is the year of first publication or, in the case of unpublished names, the year of its earliest known usage. Some cultivar names have been used more than once.

== A ==
- Nepenthes 'Accentual Koto' (1984)
- Nepenthes 'Adorable Fuso' (1999)
- Nepenthes 'Aglow Koto' (1985)
- Nepenthes 'Aichi' (1986)
- Nepenthes 'Akaba' (1995)
- Nepenthes 'Alba' (1994)
- Nepenthes 'Alta May' (1994)
- Nepenthes 'Ambrosial Koto' (1983)
- Nepenthes 'Amy Michelle' (1994)
- Nepenthes 'Asahi' (1999)
- Nepenthes 'Attractive Fuso' (1999)
- Nepenthes 'Attractive Koto' (1995)

== B ==
- Nepenthes 'Balmy Koto' (1983)
- Nepenthes 'Bario' (1999)
- Nepenthes 'Bastido' (1996)
- Nepenthes 'Bella' (1999)
- Nepenthes 'Benign Koto' (1994)
- Nepenthes 'Bizen' (1999)
- Nepenthes 'Boca Rose' (1994)
- Nepenthes 'Boschiana Mimic' (1985)
- Nepenthes 'Bruce Bednar' (2000)

== C ==
- Nepenthes 'Cantley's Red' (1986)
- Nepenthes 'Cathy Jo' (1993)

== D ==
- Nepenthes 'Dainty Koto' (1985)
- Nepenthes 'Dashy Koto' (1984)
- Nepenthes 'David Parkyn' (1996)
- Nepenthes 'Decorous Koto' (1994)
- Nepenthes 'Delectable Koto' (1994)
- Nepenthes 'Delightful Koto' (1994)
- Nepenthes 'Dignified Koto' (1994)
- Nepenthes 'Dinkum Koto' (1990)
- Nepenthes 'Director George T. Moore' (1950)
- Nepenthes 'Divine Koto' (1994)
- Nepenthes 'Dr. D. C. Fairburn' (1950)
- Nepenthes 'Dr. Edgar Anderson' (1950)
- Nepenthes 'Dr. John Macfarlane' (1909)
- Nepenthes 'Dreamy Koto' (1990)
- Nepenthes 'Dreamy Yamamoto' (1995)
- Nepenthes 'Dwarf Peacock' (1994)

== E ==
- Nepenthes 'Easeful Koto' (1987)
- Nepenthes 'East Everglades' (1996)
- Nepenthes 'Ebony Koto' (1994)
- Nepenthes 'Ecstatic Koto' (1984)
- Nepenthes 'Effulgent Koto' (1987)
- Nepenthes 'Effulgent Koto' (1995)
- Nepenthes 'Elaborative Koto' (1994)
- Nepenthes 'Elegance' (1986)
- Nepenthes 'Elfine Koto' (1994)
- Nepenthes 'Emmarene' (1991)
- Nepenthes 'Emmarene Savanah Rose' (1994)
- Nepenthes 'Emotional Koto' (1990)
- Nepenthes 'Engaging Koto' (1994)
- Nepenthes 'Eternal Koto' (1994)

== F ==
- Nepenthes 'F. W. Moore' (1904)
- Nepenthes 'Fabulous Koto' (1994)
- Nepenthes 'Facetious Koto' (1994)
- Nepenthes 'Facile Koto' (1987)
- Nepenthes 'Fat Boy' (2010)
- Nepenthes 'Felicitous Koto' (1994)
- Nepenthes 'Feminine Koto' (1994)
- Nepenthes 'Ferny Koto' (1999)
- Nepenthes 'Fervent Koto' (1994)
- Nepenthes 'Festal Koto' (1994)
- Nepenthes 'Festive Koto' (1989)
- Nepenthes 'Feverish Koto' (1994)
- Nepenthes 'Fickle Koto' (1994)
- Nepenthes 'Fine Koto' (1994)
- Nepenthes 'Forceful Koto' (1994)
- Nepenthes 'Foremost Koto' (1994)
- Nepenthes 'Formal Koto' (1994)
- Nepenthes 'Frau Anna Babl' (1998)
- Nepenthes 'Freely Koto' (1999)
- Nepenthes 'Frieda Crisp' (1998)
- Nepenthes 'Frosty Koto' (1994)
- Nepenthes 'Fruity Koto' (1994)
- Nepenthes 'Fulgent Koto' (1987)
- Nepenthes 'Fumi' (1999)
- Nepenthes 'Fuso' (1989)

== G ==
- Nepenthes 'Gentle' (2003)
- Nepenthes 'Gerald Ulrici' (1950)
- Nepenthes 'Gerontic Koto' (1999)
- Nepenthes 'Giddy Koto' (1994)
- Nepenthes 'Glaring Koto' (1994)
- Nepenthes 'Glazy Koto' (1994)
- Nepenthes 'Gloire des Ardennes' (1911)
- Nepenthes 'Glorious Koto' (1994)
- Nepenthes 'Glossy Koto' (1994)
- Nepenthes 'Gold Star' (1992)
- Nepenthes 'Greenhorn' (1989)
- Nepenthes 'Grey Mist' (1996)

== H ==
- Nepenthes 'Hachijo' (1987)
- Nepenthes 'Hachijo' (1992)
- Nepenthes 'Haguro' (1999)
- Nepenthes 'Hamafuefuki' (1995)
- Nepenthes 'Hamakumiko' (1989)
- Nepenthes 'Heian' (1985)
- Nepenthes 'Henry Shaw' (1950)
- Nepenthes 'Hideki' (1995)
- Nepenthes 'Highland' (1998)
- Nepenthes 'Hirakata' (1999)
- Nepenthes 'Hiramasa' (1995)
- Nepenthes 'Hiroko' (1999)
- Nepenthes 'Hortulanus Otten' (2004)
- Nepenthes 'Hyogo' (1995)

== I ==
- Nepenthes 'Idyllic Koto' (1996)
- Nepenthes 'Igneous Koto' (1994)
- Nepenthes 'Ile de France' (1983)
- Nepenthes 'Immobile Koto' (1994)
- Nepenthes 'Issey' (1989)

== J ==
- Nepenthes 'J & B' (1999)
- Nepenthes 'Jack Finney' (1998)
- Nepenthes 'Jeanie Babe' (1996)
- Nepenthes 'Jessica Laureen' (1994)
- Nepenthes 'Joanne Holland' (1989)
- Nepenthes 'Joseph Cutak' (1950)
- Nepenthes 'Judith Finn' (1998)

== K ==
- Nepenthes 'Kalamity' (1994)
- Nepenthes 'Kametodo' (1999)
- Nepenthes 'Kashiwa' (1999)
- Nepenthes 'Katharine Moore' (1950)
- Nepenthes 'Kayoko' (1999)
- Nepenthes 'Kei' (1999)
- Nepenthes 'Kihachijo' (1995)
- Nepenthes 'Kishino' (1999)
- Nepenthes 'Kiso' (1995)
- Nepenthes 'Koiwado' (1995)
- Nepenthes 'Koiwado' (1999)
- Nepenthes 'Kokkome' (1995)
- Nepenthes 'Kosobe' (1979)
- Nepenthes 'Kosobe' (1995)
- Nepenthes 'Kyoko' (1999)

== L ==
- Nepenthes 'L'Insolite' (1906)
- Nepenthes 'Lady Pauline' (2007)
- Nepenthes 'Lake Poso' (2009)
- Nepenthes 'LeeAnn Marie' (1994)
- Nepenthes 'Lewis Bradbury' (1914)
- Nepenthes 'Lieut. R. Bradford Pring' (1950)
- Nepenthes 'Londt' (1996)
- Nepenthes 'Luzon' (1995)

== M ==
- Nepenthes 'Manny Herrera' (1995)
- Nepenthes 'Marie' (1998)
- Nepenthes 'Mary Cruz' (1993)
- Nepenthes 'Mekata' (1999)
- Nepenthes 'Menarabe' (1999)
- Nepenthes 'Mercury' (1999)
- Nepenthes 'Michael Lee' (1994)
- Nepenthes 'Midori' (1999)
- Nepenthes 'Mihara' (1995)
- Nepenthes 'Mimic' (1985)
- Nepenthes 'Minami' (1999)
- Nepenthes 'Minami Triumph' (1996)
- Nepenthes 'Mino'o' (1979)
- Nepenthes 'Miranda' (2003)
- Nepenthes 'Mixta Sanguinea' (1894)
- Nepenthes 'Miyo' (1999)
- Nepenthes 'Mizuho' (1979)

== N ==
- Nepenthes 'Nagamogo' (1987)
- Nepenthes 'Nago' (1995)
- Nepenthes 'Nagoya' (1979)
- Nepenthes 'Nagoya Variegata' (1979)
- Nepenthes 'Nakaccho' (1995)
- Nepenthes 'Nakanogo' (1995)
- Nepenthes 'Nanbara' (1995)
- Nepenthes 'Nasu' (1989)
- Nepenthes 'Nell Horner' (1950)
- Nepenthes 'Nighttime Regal' (1997)
- Nepenthes 'Nina Dodd' (1988)
- Nepenthes 'Niwa' (1995)
- Nepenthes 'Noboriryu' (1995)
- Nepenthes 'Nora' (1998)

== O ==
- Nepenthes 'Ogo' (1995)
- Nepenthes 'Okazaki' (1999)
- Nepenthes 'Okuyama' (1995)
- Nepenthes 'Oriental Rouge' (1995)
- Nepenthes 'Otokuni' (1999)

== P ==
- Nepenthes 'Peter D'Amato' (1998)
- Nepenthes 'Petra' (1996)
- Nepenthes 'Pisacho' (1996)
- Nepenthes 'Prosperity' (1986)
- Nepenthes 'Prosperity' (1995)

== R ==
- Nepenthes 'Rapa' (1999)
- Nepenthes 'Raven' (1996)
- Nepenthes 'Red Rocket' (2010)
- Nepenthes 'Red Skeleton' (1998)
- Nepenthes 'Remilly' (1905)
- Nepenthes 'Rex' (1998)
- Nepenthes 'Rokko' (1979)
- Nepenthes 'Ron Determann' (1989)
- Nepenthes 'Rouge' (1994)
- Nepenthes 'Rubra' (1985)
- Nepenthes 'Ruby' (1908)

== S ==
- Nepenthes 'Sachiko' (1999)
- Nepenthes 'Saitoh' (1999)
- Nepenthes 'Sakura' (1995)
- Nepenthes 'Sakura' (1999)
- Nepenthes 'Sanderiana' (1980)
- Nepenthes 'Sanglant' (1909)
- Nepenthes 'Santa Mira' (1998)
- Nepenthes 'Sanyo' (1999)
- Nepenthes 'Saturn' (1999)
- Nepenthes 'Savanah Rose' (1999)
- Nepenthes 'Scarlet Splash' (2001)
- Nepenthes 'Sens' (1998)
- Nepenthes 'Shamenbana' (1995)
- Nepenthes 'Shinjiku' (1979)
- Nepenthes 'Shinjuku' (1979)
- Nepenthes 'Shinjuku Grandifolia' (1985)
- Nepenthes 'Shivas Regal' (1997)
- Nepenthes 'Showa' (1999)
- Nepenthes 'Singapore Giant' (1998)
- Nepenthes 'Sir William Thiselton Dyer' (1900)
- Nepenthes 'Snazz Chas' (1996)
- Nepenthes 'Sohma' (1989)
- Nepenthes 'Spali' (1999)
- Nepenthes 'St. Louis' (1950)
- Nepenthes 'Supari' (1995)
- Nepenthes 'Superba' (1931)
- Nepenthes 'Superba' (1994)
- Nepenthes 'Suzue Kondo' (1986)

== T ==
- Nepenthes 'Taipei' (1995)
- Nepenthes 'Takao' (1999)
- Nepenthes 'Takayuki Sakai' (1986)
- Nepenthes 'Tametomo' (1995)
- Nepenthes 'Ted Payne' (1994)
- Nepenthes 'Tokuyoshi Kondo' (1986)
- Nepenthes 'Tomomi' (1999)
- Nepenthes 'Trina' (1996)
- Nepenthes 'Tsangoya' (1995)
- Nepenthes 'Tsujimoto' (1979)

== V ==
- Nepenthes 'Velvet' (2003)
- Nepenthes 'Venus' (1999)
- Nepenthes 'Ville de Rouen' (1983)
- Nepenthes 'Ville de Rouen' (1995)
- Nepenthes 'Vittata' (1994)

== W ==
- Nepenthes 'Winged' (1995)

== Y ==
- Nepenthes 'Yakkome' (1999)
- Nepenthes 'Yamana' (1999)
- Nepenthes 'Yatomi' (1986)
- Nepenthes 'Yoyogi' (1989)
- Nepenthes 'Yubama' (1995)

== Z ==
- Nepenthes 'Zonal Koto' (1994)

== See also ==
- Lists of cultivars
