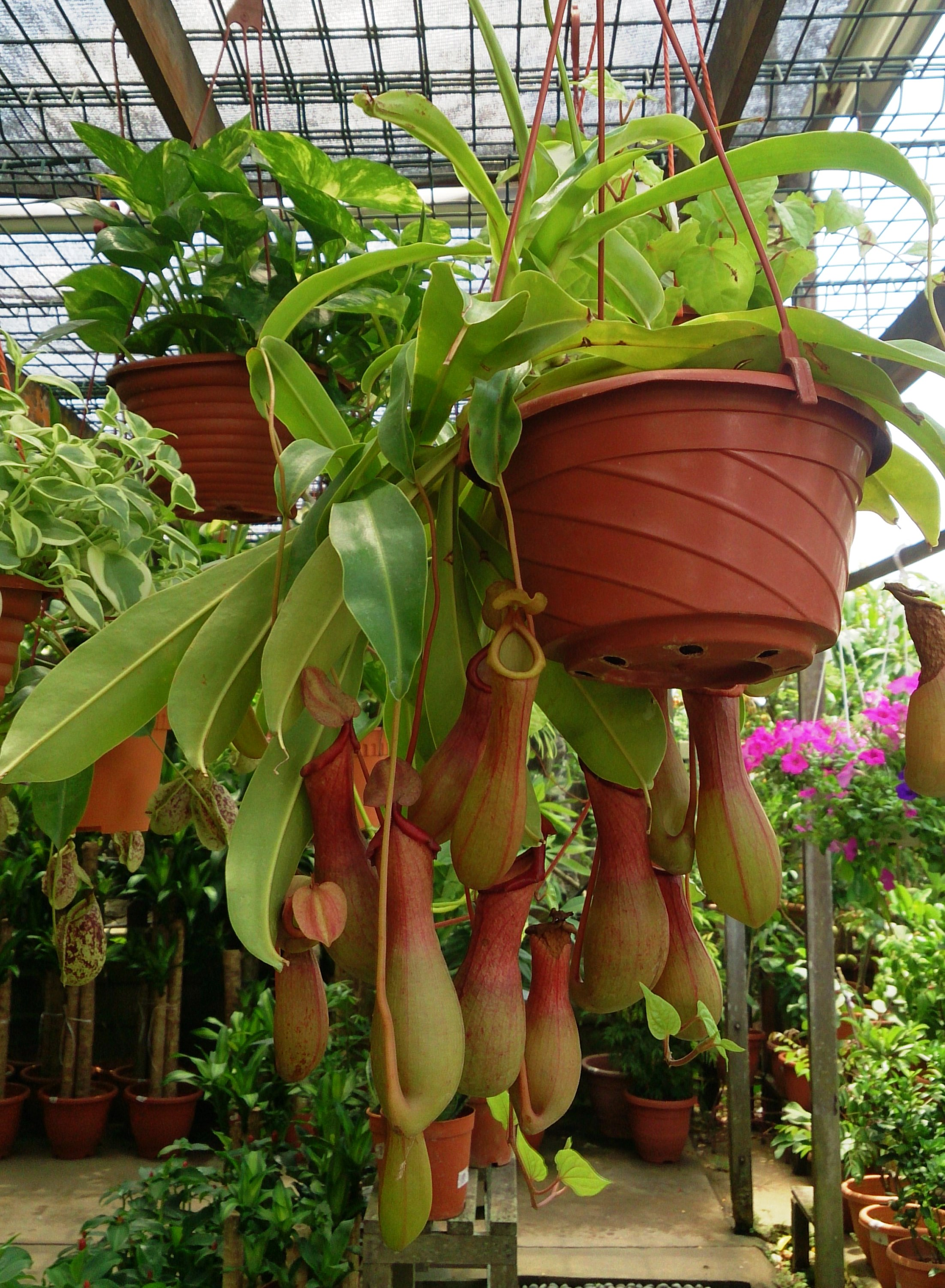
- Nepenthes × ventrata in cultivation.

Scientific classification
- Kingdom: Plantae
- Clade: Tracheophytes
- Clade: Angiosperms
- Clade: Eudicots
- Order: Caryophyllales
- Family: Nepenthaceae
- Genus: Nepenthes
- Species: N. × ventrata

Binomial name
- Nepenthes × ventrata Hort. ex Fleming (1979) nom.nud.

= Nepenthes × ventrata =

Species of carnivorous plant

Nepenthes × ventrata (/nɪˈpɛnθiːz vɛnˈtrɑːtə/) is a natural hybrid involving N. alata and N. ventricosa. Like its two parent species, it is endemic to the Philippines. The name was originally published in the Carnivorous Plant Newsletter in 1979. Nepenthes × ventrata is one of the most common tissue cultured Nepenthes plants, although it is often mislabelled as Nepenthes alata. It is relatively easy to grow indoors and is usually the first tropical pitcher plant seen by consumers due to its availability in many garden shops and home centres.

The cultivar N. 'LeeAnn Marie' is a later synonym of N. × ventrata, although the name is not established as it was not validly published.
