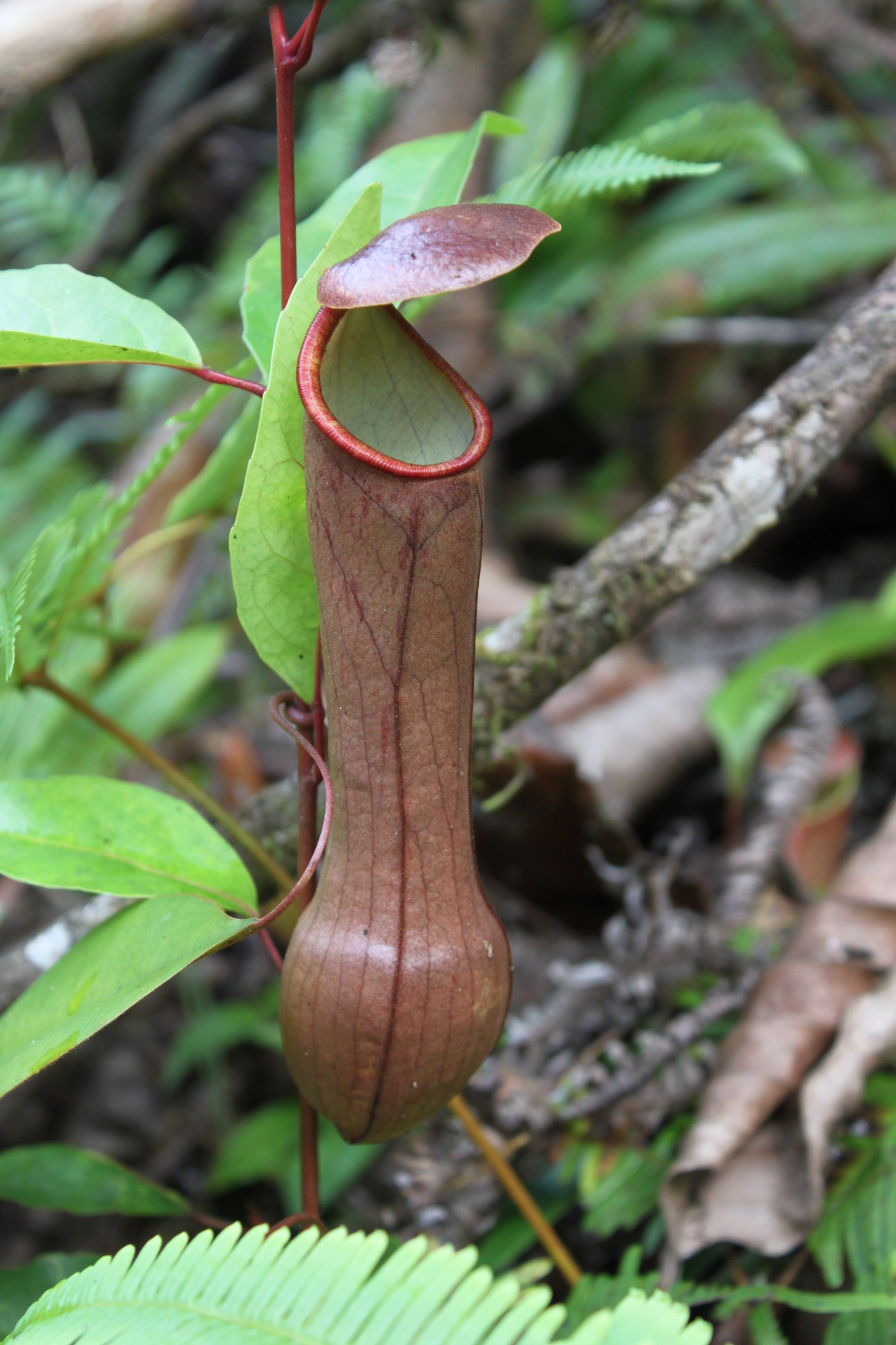
- An upper pitcher of Nepenthes distillatoria from Sinharaja Forest Reserve, Sri Lanka

Conservation status
- Vulnerable (IUCN 2.3)

Scientific classification
- Kingdom: Plantae
- Clade: Tracheophytes
- Clade: Angiosperms
- Clade: Eudicots
- Order: Caryophyllales
- Family: Nepenthaceae
- Genus: Nepenthes
- Species: N. distillatoria

Binomial name
- Nepenthes distillatoria L. (1753)
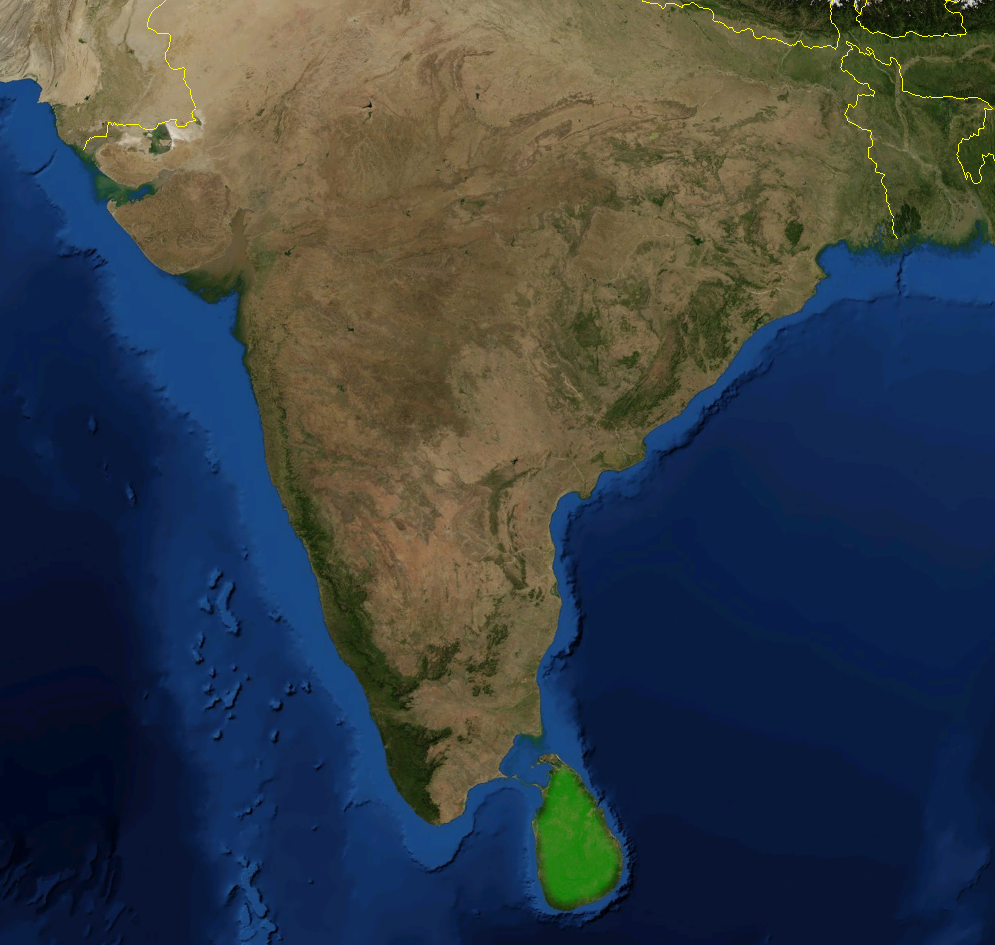
- Distribution of N. distillatoria.

Synonyms
- Synonyms: Bandura zeylanica Burm. ex Brongn. (1824) nom.illeg.; Nepenthes chapmanii N.P.Balakr. (1970); Nepenthes destillatoria Beck (1895); Danser (1928) sphalm.typogr.; Nepenthes hirsuta var. glabrescens W.G.Sm. (1882); Nepenthes hirsuta var. glabrescens rubra auct. non Hort. ex Rafarin: Nichols. (1892); Nepenthes indica Poir. (1797) nom.illeg.; Nepenthes rubra auct. non Hort.Van Houtte ex Rafarin: Nichols. (1886); Nepenthes smithii Beck (1895) nom.illeg.; Nepenthes speciosa Hort. ex Beck (1895) nom.illeg.; Nepenthes trichocarpa auct. non Miq.: Hort. ex Hort.Bednar in sched. (1993); Nepenthes zeylanica (Burm. ex Brongn.) Raf. (1836); Nepenthes zeylanica var. rubra (auct. non Hort. ex Rafarin: Nichols.) Veitch ex Wilson (1877); Nepenthes zeylanicus V.J.Chapm. (1947); Heterochresonyms: Nepenthes distillatoria auct. non L.: Brion (1855) [=N. madagascariensis]; Nepenthes distillatoria auct. non L.: Jack (1835) [=N. gracilis]; Nepenthes distillatoria auct. non L.: Jeann. (1894) [=N. vieillardii]; Nepenthes distillatoria auct. non L.: R.Grah. (1827) [=N. khasiana]; Nepenthes distillatoria auct. non L.: Steud. (1841) [=N. mirabilis]; Nepenthes distillatoria auct. non L.: Wall. (1828) [=N. distillatoria/N. gracilis]; Pre-Linnaean names: "Badura. Planta Zeylanica in foliorum extremo folliculum peniformem expansum habens." Herm. (1726); "Bandura. Planta Zeylanica, cujus foliorum extremus folliculus peniformis expendet." Herm. (1726); "Bandura cingalensium" Ray (1686); "Bandura Zeylanica" Burm. (1737); "Bandura zingalensium" Breyne (1680); "Miranda herba" Bartholinus (1677); "Nepenthes Zeylanicum flore minore" Breyne (1689); "Planta mirabilis destillatoria" H.N.Grimm (1683); "Utricaria vegetabilis Zeylanensium, Bandura Cingalibus dicta" Pluk. (1696)

= Nepenthes distillatoria =

Species of pitcher plant from Sri Lanka

Nepenthes distillatoria (/nɪˈpɛnθiːz dɪˌstɪləˈtɔːriə/; Neo-Latin, from Latin: destillo "to distill", -oria, adjectival ending; "something from which a liquid is distilled", i.e., pitcher) is a tropical pitcher plant endemic to Sri Lanka. It was the second Nepenthes species to be described in print and the first to be formally named under the Linnaean system of taxonomy. It is therefore the type species of the genus.

== Botanical history ==
Nepenthes distillatoria was the second Nepenthes species to be described in print, after N. madagascariensis. In 1677, Danish physician Thomas Bartholin made brief mention of it under the name Miranda herba, Latin for "marvelous herb". Three years later, Polish–Dutch merchant Jacob Breyne referred to this species as Bandura zingalensium, after a local name for the plant. Bandura subsequently became the most commonly used name for the tropical pitcher plants, until Linnaeus coined Nepenthes in 1737.

Nepenthes distillatoria was again described in 1683, this time by Swedish physician and naturalist Herman Niklas Grim. Grim called it Planta mirabilis destillatoria, or the "miraculous distilling plant", and was the first to clearly illustrate a tropical pitcher plant. Three years later, in 1686, English naturalist John Ray quoted Grim as saying:

The root draws up moisture from the earth which with the help of the sun's rays rises up into the plant itself and then flows down through the stems and nerves of the leaves into the natural utensil to be stored there until used for human needs. [translated from Latin in Pitcher-Plants of Borneo]

Linnaeus used Grim's original specific epithet when naming N. distillatoria in 1753.

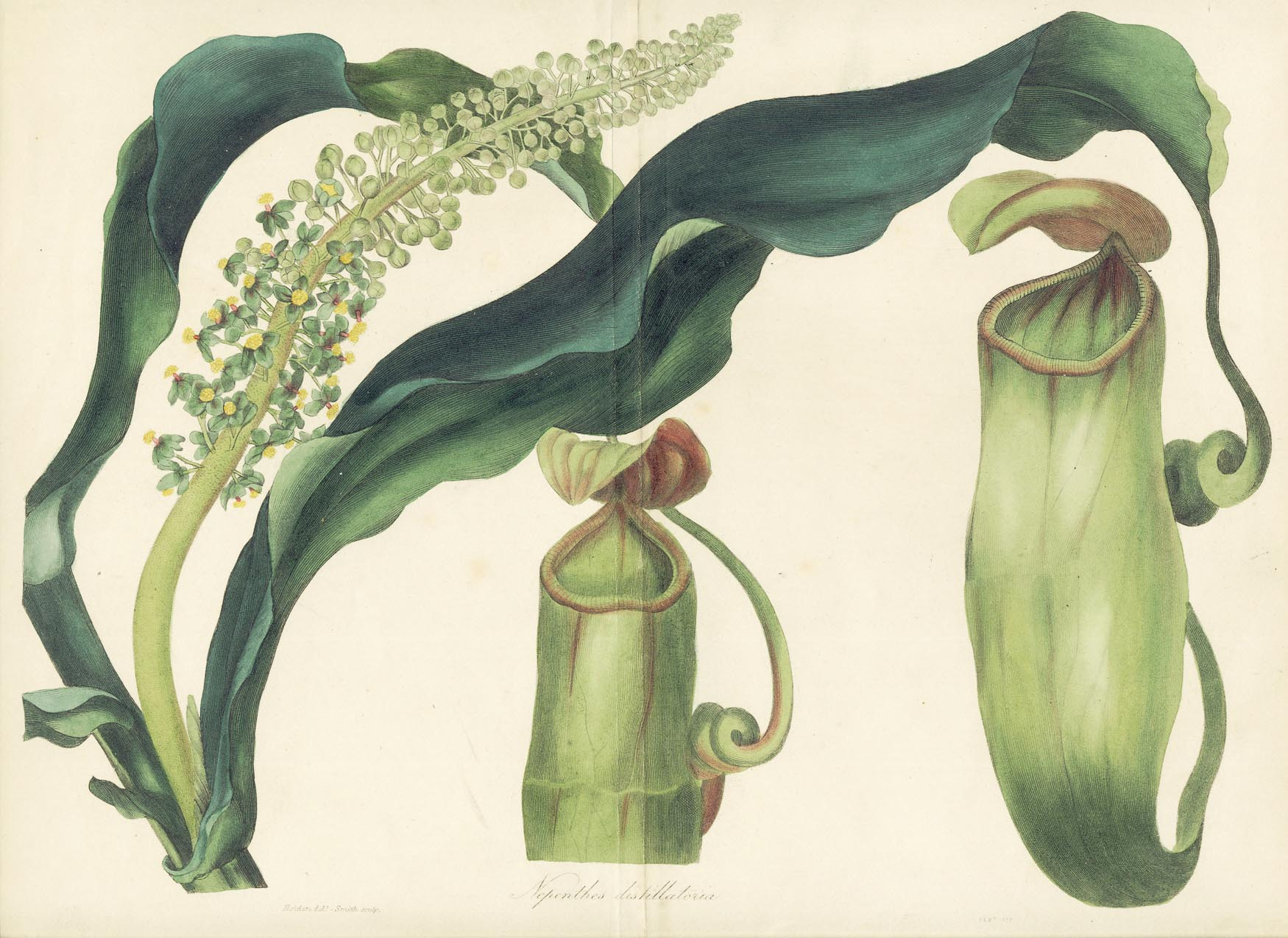
Nepenthes distillatoria from Joseph Paxton's Magazine of Botany of 1838

Nepenthes distillatoria was again illustrated in Johannes Burmann's Thesaurus Zeylanicus of 1737. The drawing depicts the end of a flowering stem with pitchers. Burmann refers to the plant as Bandura zeylanica.

In the horticultural trade of the late 19th century, N. distillatoria was often confused with N. khasiana of India.

== Ecology ==
Nepenthes distillatoria is endemic to Sri Lanka and is the only Nepenthes species recorded from the island. It grows in waterlogged open scrub, along road embankments and other cleared areas, and in forest. N. distillatoria occurs from sea level to 700 m altitude.

Due to its isolation, N. distillatoria has no known natural hybrids.

== Infraspecific taxa ==
Three infraspecific taxa of N. distillatoria have been described, although they are no longer considered valid.

- Nepenthes distillatoria var. rubra (Nichols.) Hort.Veitch ex Lindsay (1891)
- Nepenthes distillatoria var. speciosa Hort.Van Houtte ex Rafarin (1869)
- Nepenthes distillatoria var. vera D.Moore (1872)
