= Jacob Breyne =

German merchant and botanist (1637–1697)

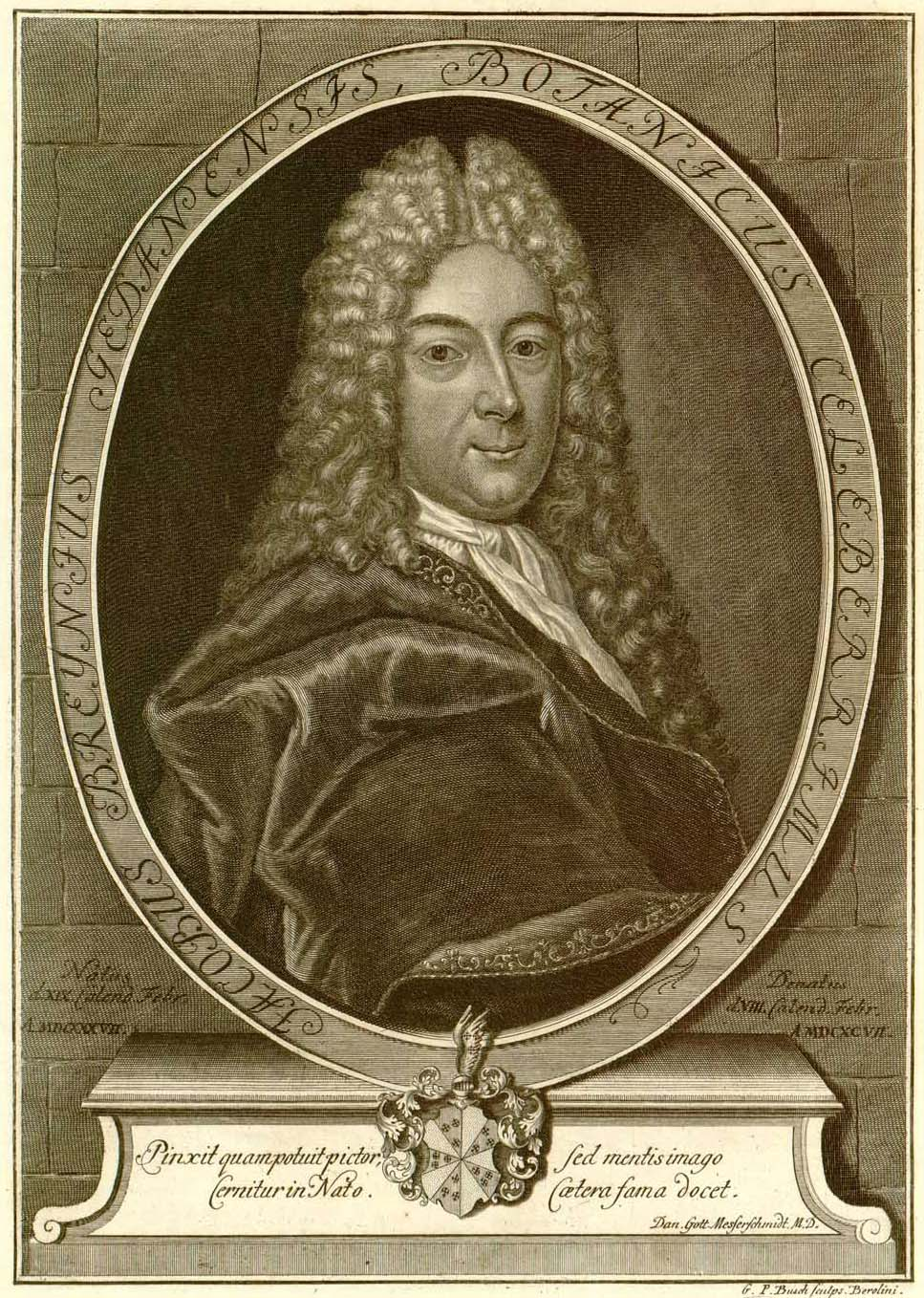
- Jakob Breyne, Abbildung in Prodromi fasciculi rariorum plantarum primus et secundus, 1739
- Born: January 14, 1637; Danzig, Royal Prussia, Kingdom of Poland
- Died: January 25, 1697 (aged 60); Danzig, Royal Prussia, Kingdom of Poland
- Occupations: merchant, naturalist, artist

Jacob Breyne (14 January 1637 – 25 January 1697) was a German merchant and botanist, born and active in Danzig (Gdańsk), Royal Prussia, Crown of the Kingdom of Poland. He was the father of Johann Philipp Breyne.

== Biography ==
Breyne was interested in plants from a young age, and collected specimens from around Danzig. He recorded where they were found and included ecological notes on each plant. He also collected specimens and plant illustrations from elsewhere, including the famous portfolio of paintings of Cape of Good Hope plants. These artworks were purchased in 1956, by Sir Ernest Oppenheimer.

In 1661 Breyne made his first trip of many to the Netherlands. He became acquainted with prominent members of the community there who kept gardens which included some of the most beautiful and rare plants. A large number of the plants Breyne drew came from Van Beverningk, from Oud-Teilingen Sassenheim near Leiden.

Breyne died in Danzig in 1697.

== Works ==
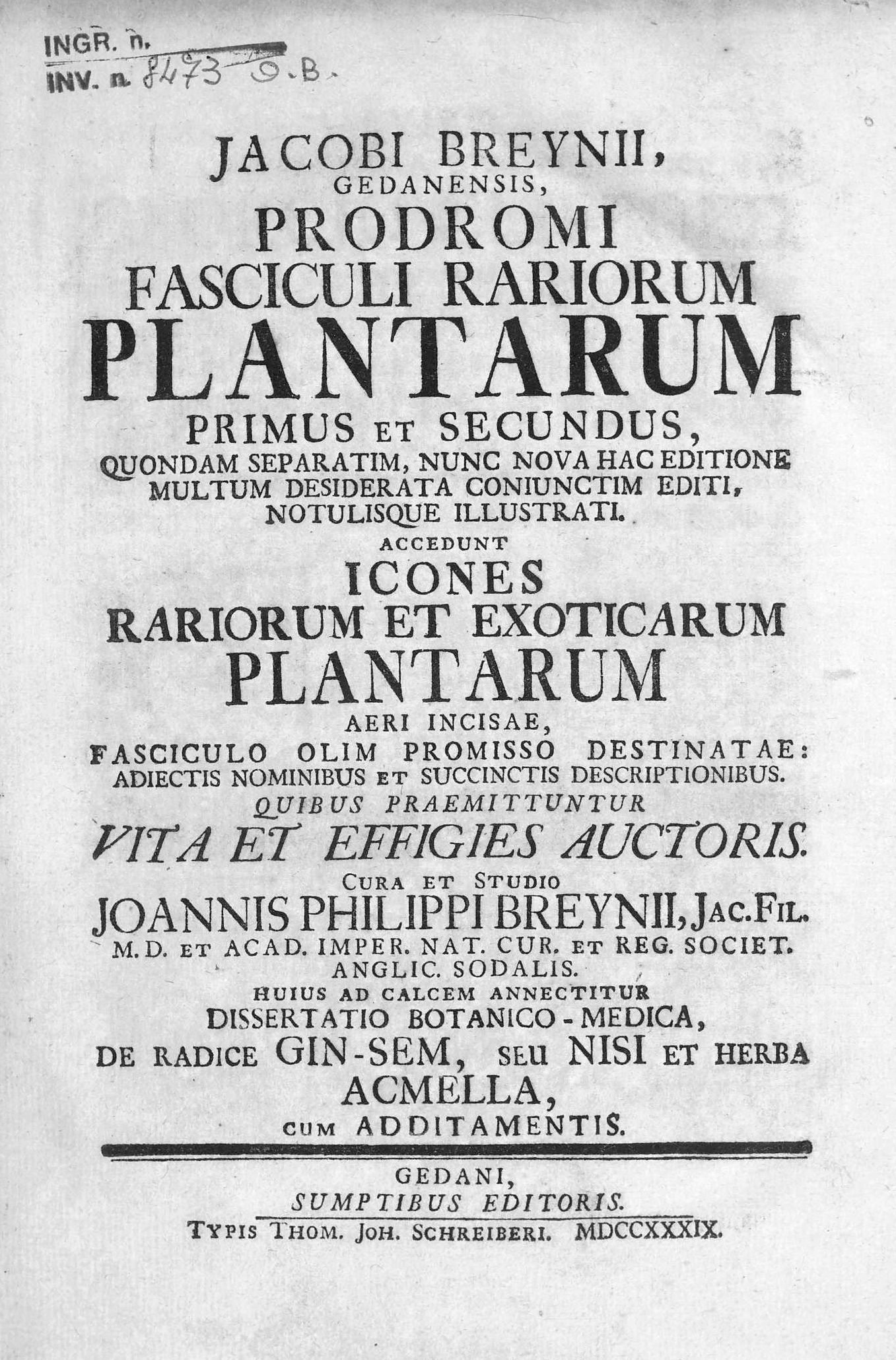
Prodromi fasciculi rariorum plantarum primus et secundus, 1739

- Jacobi Breynii, Johann Philipp Breynii, Exoticarum aliarumque minus cognitarum plantarum centuria prima, 1678.
- Jacobi Breynii, Christian Mentzel, Pinax botanōnymos polyglōttos katholikos, Index nominum plantarum universalis, 1682.
- Prodromi fasciculi rariorum plantarum primus et secundus (in Latin). Gdańsk: Thomas Johann Schreiber. 1739.
