= La Dorée =

- Commune
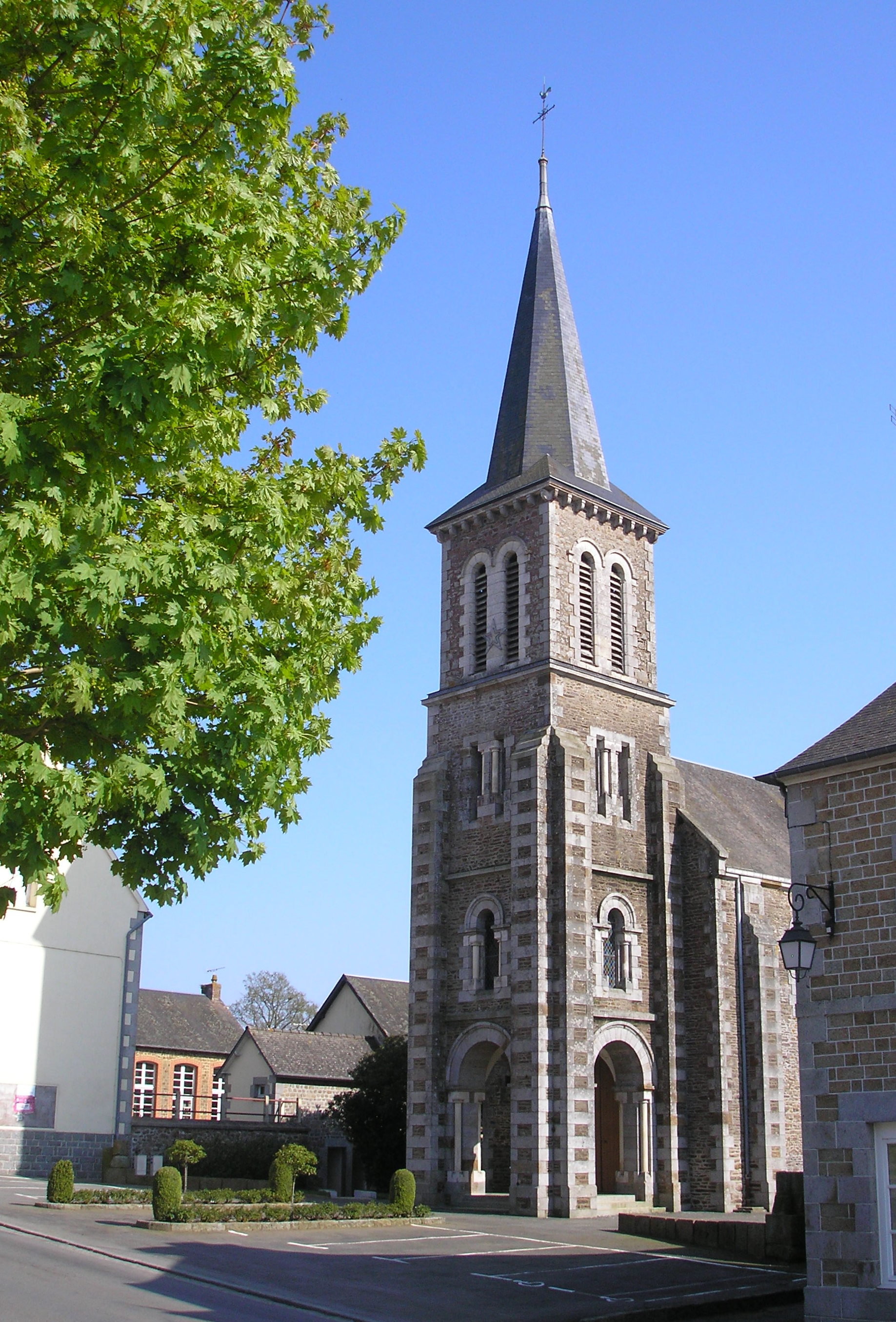
- The church in La Dorée
- Location of La Dorée
- Location within France Location within Pays de la Loire
- Coordinates: 48°26′58″N 0°57′50″W
- Country: France
- Region: Pays de la Loire
- Department: Mayenne
- Arrondissement: Mayenne
- Canton: Gorron

Government
  - Mayor (2020–2026): Patrick Lemaître
- Area^{1}: 17.84 km^{2} (6.89 sq mi)
- Elevation: 200 m (660 ft)
- Highest elevation: 249 m (817 ft)
- Lowest elevation: 140 m (460 ft)
- Population (2023): 286
  - Density: 16.0/km^{2} (41.5/sq mi)
- Time zone: UTC+01:00 (CET)
  - Summer (DST): UTC+02:00 (CEST)
- INSEE/Postal code: 53093 /53190
- ^{1} French Land Register data, which excludes lakes, ponds, glaciers > 1 km^{2} (0.386 sq mi or 247 acres) and river estuaries.

La Dorée (French pronunciation: [la dɔʁe]) is a commune in the Mayenne department in north-western France.

== See also ==
- Communes of the Mayenne department
