= Michurina (rural locality) =

Michurina (Russian: Мичу́рина) is the name of several rural localities in Russia:

== Modern localities ==
- Michurina, Republic of Adygea, a settlement in Maykopsky District of the Republic of Adygea; 44°28′N 40°10′E
- Michurina, Chechen Republic, a settlement in Goyskaya Rural Administration of Urus-Martanovsky District in the Chechen Republic
- Michurina, Tambov Oblast, a settlement in Izosimovsky Selsoviet of Michurinsky District in Tambov Oblast
- Michurina, Aleksinsky District, Tula Oblast, a settlement in Michurinsky Rural Okrug of Aleksinsky District in Tula Oblast
- Michurina, Yefremovsky District, Tula Oblast, a settlement in Yasenovsky Rural Okrug of Yefremovsky District in Tula Oblast

== Alternative names ==
- Michurina, alternative name of Michurino, a village in Nadvinsky Rural Administrative Okrug of Kletnyansky District in Bryansk Oblast; 53°29′N 33°22′E

== See also ==
- imeni Michurina
