= Graft hybrid =

Graft hybridisation refers to a form of asexual hybridisation where heritable modifications can be induced through grafting. Grafting joins plant parts, forming a genetically composite organism functioning as one plant. A scion is a shoot from one plant that, after grafting, grows on the upper part of another plant. The stock receives the scion and serves as the root system for the grafted plant.

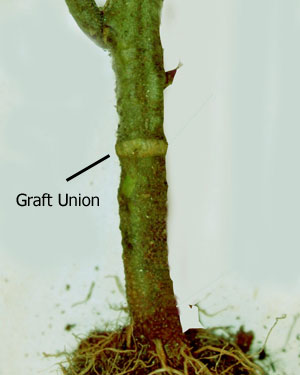
Grafted tomato plant with a clear graft junction

== Differentiation from graft chimeras ==
Graft chimeras are not true hybrids. In graft chimeras it is possible that the two parent tissues become separated again, revealing the original parents.

Graft hybridisation however involves the transfer of genetic material.

== Mechanism ==
Genetic material can be passed from one cell to another through plasmodesmata, transversing the graft junction

The tissues of both parts are joined together through pluripotent cells. First, undifferentiated callus tissue arises, which later differentiates and forms vascular tissue, which connects both partners of the graft union. Plasmodesmata form between the cells of tissues of both ends of the graft junction. Plastid DNA has been proven to be exchanged through the graft union. Entire nuclear genomes are also known to cross the graft junction through plasmodesmata. Graft hybridisation is explained by horizontal gene transfer, DNA transformation, and the long-distance transport of mRNA and small RNAs.

== Examples ==
=== Graft hybridisation in eudicots ===
This technique has been demonstrated in Nicotiana, as well as in Solanum.

=== Graft hybridisation in monocots ===
The successful creation of an intergeneric graft hybrid of Sorghum and Zea has been demonstrated.

Hereditary changes of Triticum through graft hybridisation (vegetative hybridisation) have also been recorded.

== Significance ==
Hybridisation through grafting has the potential to create economically significant hybrid plants. Graft hybridisation is a simple and practical method for breeding woody plants, particularly helpful for overcoming reproductive isolation and difficulties due to highly heterozygous genotypes.

== History ==
This process was first discussed by Charles Darwin. This idea has been widely rejected for more than a century, until it has been proven to occur with modern methods. Evidence in favour of graft hybridisation was dismissed as fraudulent.
