= Graft-chimaera =

Plant chimaera created through grafting

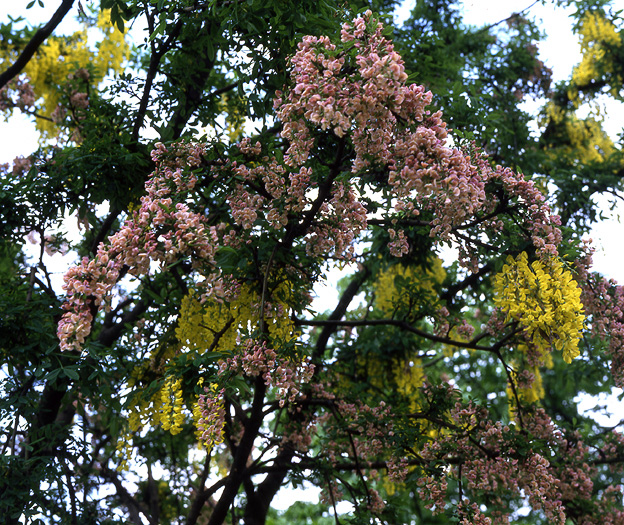
The small tree + Laburnocytisus 'Adamii' is a spectacular example of a graft-chimaera

In horticulture, a graft-chimaera may arise in grafting at the point of contact between rootstock and scion and will have properties intermediate between those of its "parents". Unlike graft hybrids, a graft-chimaera is not a true hybrid but a mixture of cells, each with the genotype of one of its "parents": it is a chimaera. Hence, the once widely used term "graft-hybrid" is no longer regarded as suitable for a graft-chimaera.

Propagation is by cloning only. In practice graft-chimaeras are not noted for their stability and may easily revert to one of the "parents".

== Nomenclature ==
Article 21 of the ICNCP stipulates that a graft-chimaera can be indicated either by

- a formula: the names of both "parents", in alphabetical order, joined by the plus sign "+":

Crataegus + Mespilus

- a name:
  - if the "parents" belong to different genera a name may be formed by joining part of one generic name to the whole of the other generic name. This name must not be identical to a generic name published under the International Code of Nomenclature for algae, fungi, and plants (ICN). For example + Crataegomespilus is the name for the graft-chimaera which may also be indicated by the formula Crataegus + Mespilus. This name is clearly different from × Crataemespilus, the name under the ICN for the true hybrid between Crataegus and Mespilus, which can also be designated by the formula Crataegus × Mespilus. (Note: + Crataegomespilus is now considered a synonym for Crataegus.)
  - if both "parents" belong to the same genus the graft-chimaera may be given a cultivar name. For example Syringa 'Correlata' is a graft-chimaera involving Syringa vulgaris (common lilac) and Syringa × chinensis (Rouen lilac, which is itself a hybrid between S. vulgaris and S. persica). No plus sign is used, because both "parents" belong to the genus Syringa.

A graft-chimaera cannot have a species name, because it is simultaneously two species. Although + Laburnocytisus 'Adamii', for example, is sometimes seen written as if it were a species (+ Laburnocytisus adamii), this is incorrect.

== In Darwin's works ==
Charles Darwin "The Variation of Animals and Plants Under Domestication", 1868 г.:

I will therefore give all the facts which I have been able to collect on the formation of hybrids between distinct species or varieties, without the intervention of the sexual organs. For if, as I am now convinced, this is possible, it is a most important fact, which will sooner or later change the views held by physiologists with respect to sexual reproduction. A sufficient body of facts will afterwards be adduced, showing that the segregation or separation of the characters of the two parent-forms by bud-variation, as in the case of Cytisus adami, is not an unusual though a striking phenomenon. We shall further see that a whole bud may thus revert, or only half, or some smaller segment.

== Genera ==
The following graft-chimaera genera are accepted:

- + Arioechinopsis Mottram (Ariocarpus + Echinopsis)
- + Coryopuntia Mottram (Coryphantha + Opuntia)
- + Echinastrophytum Mottram (Astrophytum + Echinocactus)
- + Echinogymnocalycium Mottram (Echinopsis + Gymnocalycium)
- + Myrtigymnocalycium Mottram (Gymnocalycium + Myrtillocactus)
- + Ortegopuntia Tóth (Opuntia + Ortegocactus)
- + Pyrocydonia Guillaumin (Cydonia + Pyrus)
- + Uebelechinopsis G.D.Rowley (Echinopsis + Uebelmannia)

== See also ==
- Bizzarria – a very popular graft chimaera in Citrus
- Chimera (genetics) § Plants
- Grafting
- Glossary of scientific naming
