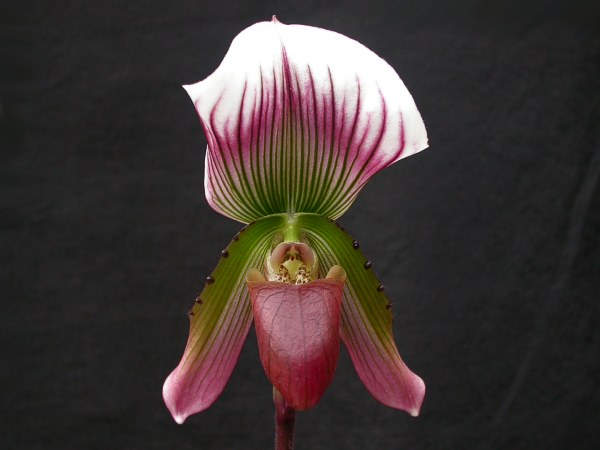
- Flower of Paphiopedilum callosum

Conservation status
- Endangered (IUCN 3.1)

Scientific classification
- Kingdom: Plantae
- Clade: Tracheophytes
- Clade: Angiosperms
- Clade: Monocots
- Order: Asparagales
- Family: Orchidaceae
- Subfamily: Cypripedioideae
- Genus: Paphiopedilum
- Species: P. callosum

Binomial name
- Paphiopedilum callosum (Rchb.f.) Stein

Synonyms
- Cypripedium callosum Rchb.f. (basionym); Cypripedium schmidtianum Kraenzl.; Paphiopedilum callosum var. schmidtianum (Kraenzl.) Pfitzer; Cordula callosa (Rchb.f.) Rolfe; Paphiopedilum callosum var. angustipetalum Guillaumin; Paphiopedilum viniferum Koop. & N.Haseg.; Paphiopedilum callosum var. viniferum (Koop. & N.Haseg.) Cavestro; Paphiopedilum crossii f. viniferum (Koop. & N.Haseg.) Braem & Chiron

= Paphiopedilum callosum =

Species of orchid

Paphiopedilum callosum is a species of slipper orchid found from Indochina to northern Peninsular Malaysia. Various hybrids forms are successfully cultivated, although its cultivation is considered to be difficult. It has been investigated and shown promising results in the treatment of cancer.

== Taxonomy ==
P. callosum was originally described as Cypripedium callosum by Reichenbach in 1886, with the epithet was derived from Latin callosus, or "thick-skinned". It was then reclassified into Paphiopedilum in Stein's Orchideenbuch in 1892, in a major reclassification of the then Cypripedium species into Paphiopedilum. A few natural variants are recognized, including var. sublaeve, var. potentianum, var. viniferum, and fma. viridiforum.

== Description ==
P. callosum grows on deep leaf litter, and occasionally on mossy boulders. It consists of 3 to 5 leaves of 10–20 centimetres (3.9–7.9 in) long and 3–5 centimetres (1.2–2.0 in) wide, with its upper surface being mottled pale and dark green, while the under side is sometimes purple-suffused, and ciliate basal margins. Its purple, pubescent inflorescence measures 12–25 centimetres (4.7–9.8 in) in height, and consists of a single flower 8–11 centimetres (3.1–4.3 in). Peak flowering occurs from April to June.

== Distribution ==
P. callosum is available from the middle and southern part of Indochina to northern Malay Peninsula, in elevations of 300–1,300 metres (980–4,270 ft) and a mean temperature of 19–24 °C (66–75 °F), and grows along rivulets in closed forests over granite and sandstone.

== Biochemical profile ==
An extraction study in 2020 discovered a novel stilbenoid, which was identified as a topoisomerase I inhibitor, with varying degrees of cytotoxicity towards human cancer cell lines.
