= Michurin, Tajikistan =

Michurin Мичурин
- Village
- Location in Tajikistan
- Coordinates: 40°10′26.06″N 69°42′31.49″E
- Country: Tajikistan
- Region: Sughd Region
- District: Ghafurov District

Population (2017)
  - Total: 2,745
- Time zone: UTC+5 (TJT)

Michurin (Tajik: Мичурин) is a village in north-western Tajikistan. It is located in Ghafurov District of Sughd Region. The village lies a few kilometers north from neighboring Kyrgyzstan, not far from Khujand International Airport. As of 2017, Michurin had a population of 2,745.

Michurin is named after the Russian agronomist Ivan Michurin. The village is home to Branch of the Institute of Horticulture and Vegetable Growing under the Tajik Academy of Agricultural Sciences.
