= Bizzarria =

Citron and orange graft

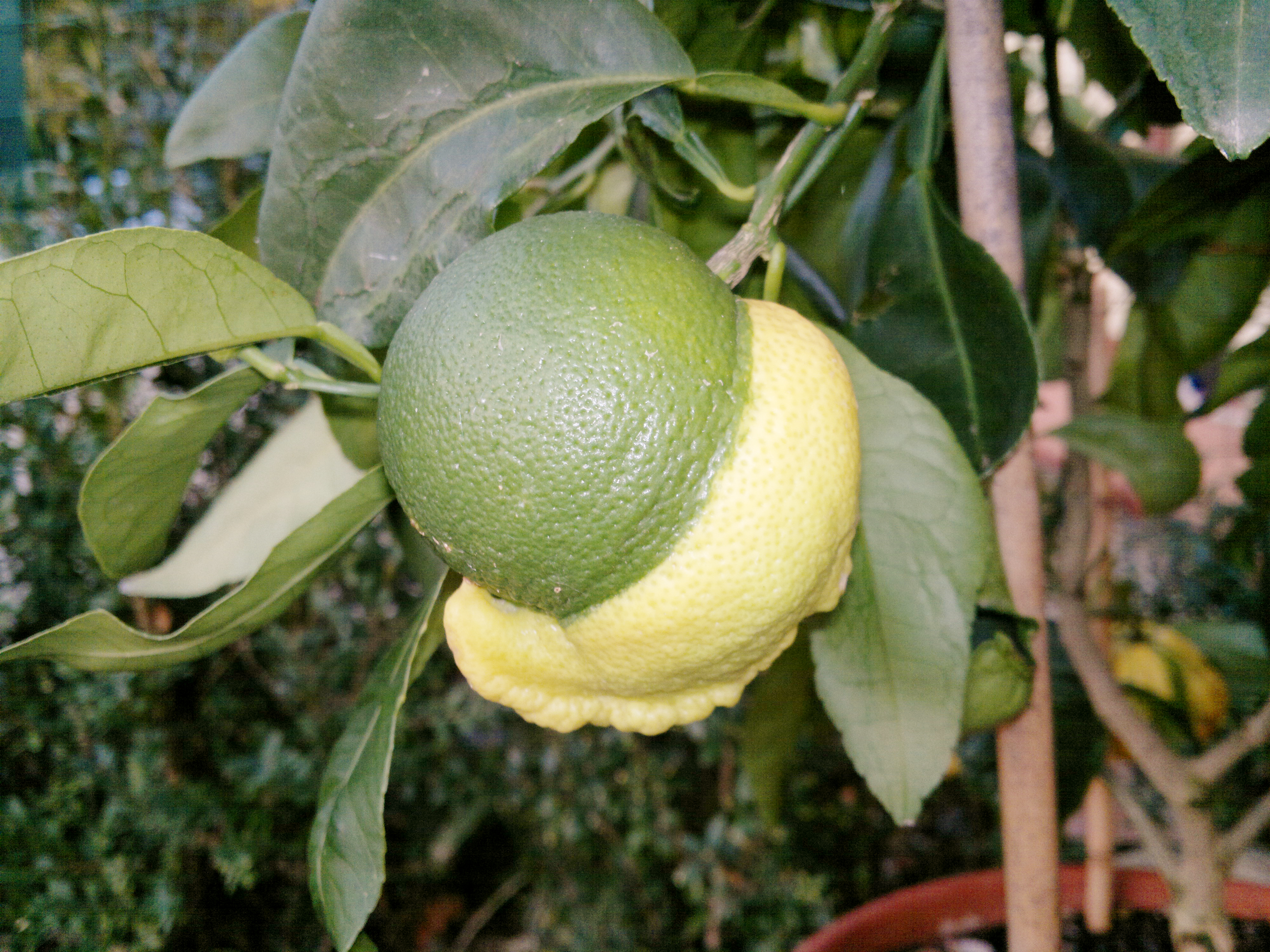
- The Florentine Bizzarria
- Genus: Citrus
- Cultivar: 'Bizzarria'

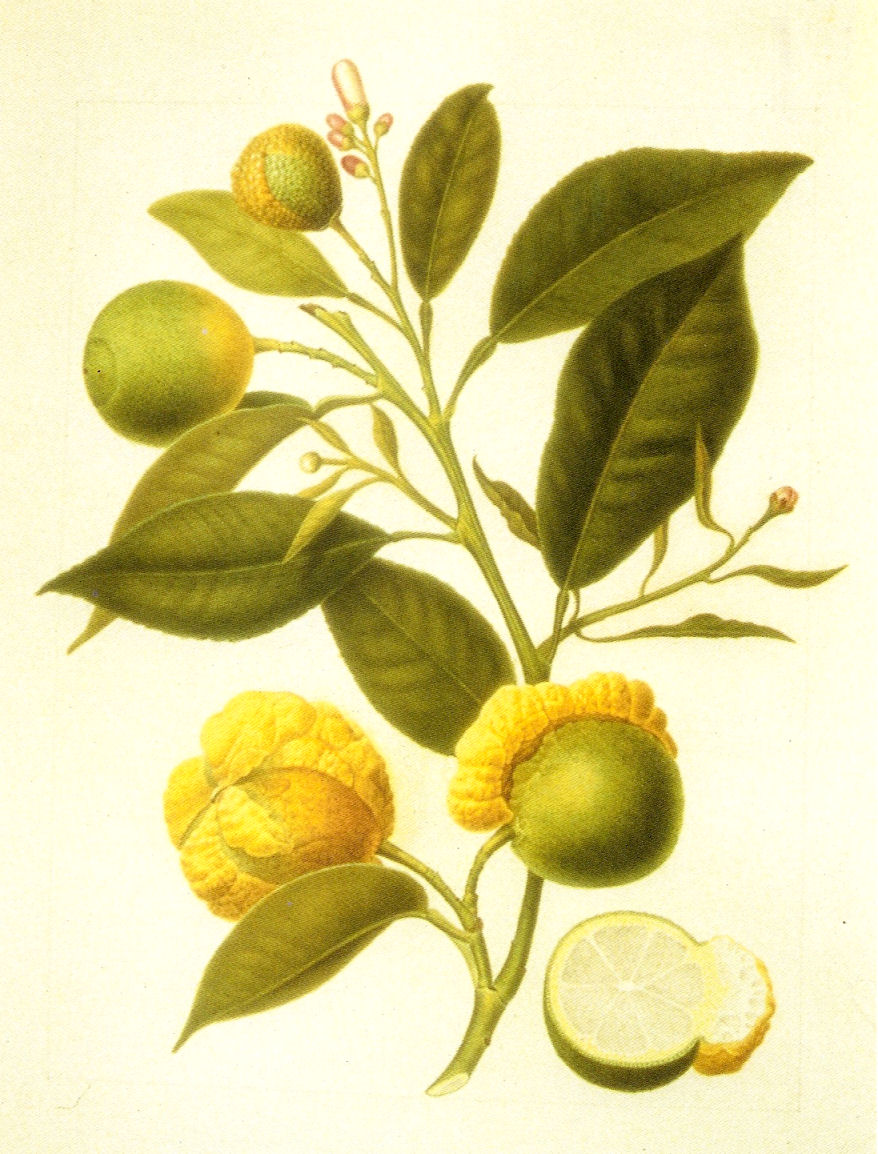
Citrus 'Bizzarria'. Drawing, by A. Poiteau in 1811, watercolour, by D. Del Pino in 1821

Bizzarria of Florence (Citrus 'Bizzarria'), which is probably the first graft chimera obtained, is a graft between the Florentine citron and the sour orange.

It produces some branches of citrated lemon including such leaves, and some branches of sour orange. The middle shoot mixes characteristics of both, and the fruit exhibits characteristics of both the citron and orange. The fruit is around 6.5 cm diameter.

Graft chimerism contrasts with somatic hybrids, which are due to plant sexuality; their offspring are intermediate, showing influences of both parental plants. The Florentine Bizzarria, on the other hand, displays an unusual fruit which distinctly expresses characteristics from each plant in close proximity.

The plant's name has a number of different spellings, e.g. Bizaria, Bizzaria, Bizzarria, Bizarria, and even Bizarre.

== Discovery ==
Citrus 'Bizzarria' was developed in 1640 at the villa named Torre degli Agli, which belonged to the wealthy Panciatichi banking family. A citron bud was grafted onto a sour orange seedling, and after an at first apparent failure to take, the plant later produced a shoot with mixed tissue at the graft site. The cultivar was thought to be lost, but was rediscovered in the 1970s by Paolo Galleotti, the head gardener of the Villa di Castello in Florence.

== See also ==
- Citrus hybrid
- Citrus taxonomy
- Grafting
- Graft-chimaera
