= Magnolia 'Elizabeth' =

Hybrid cultivar

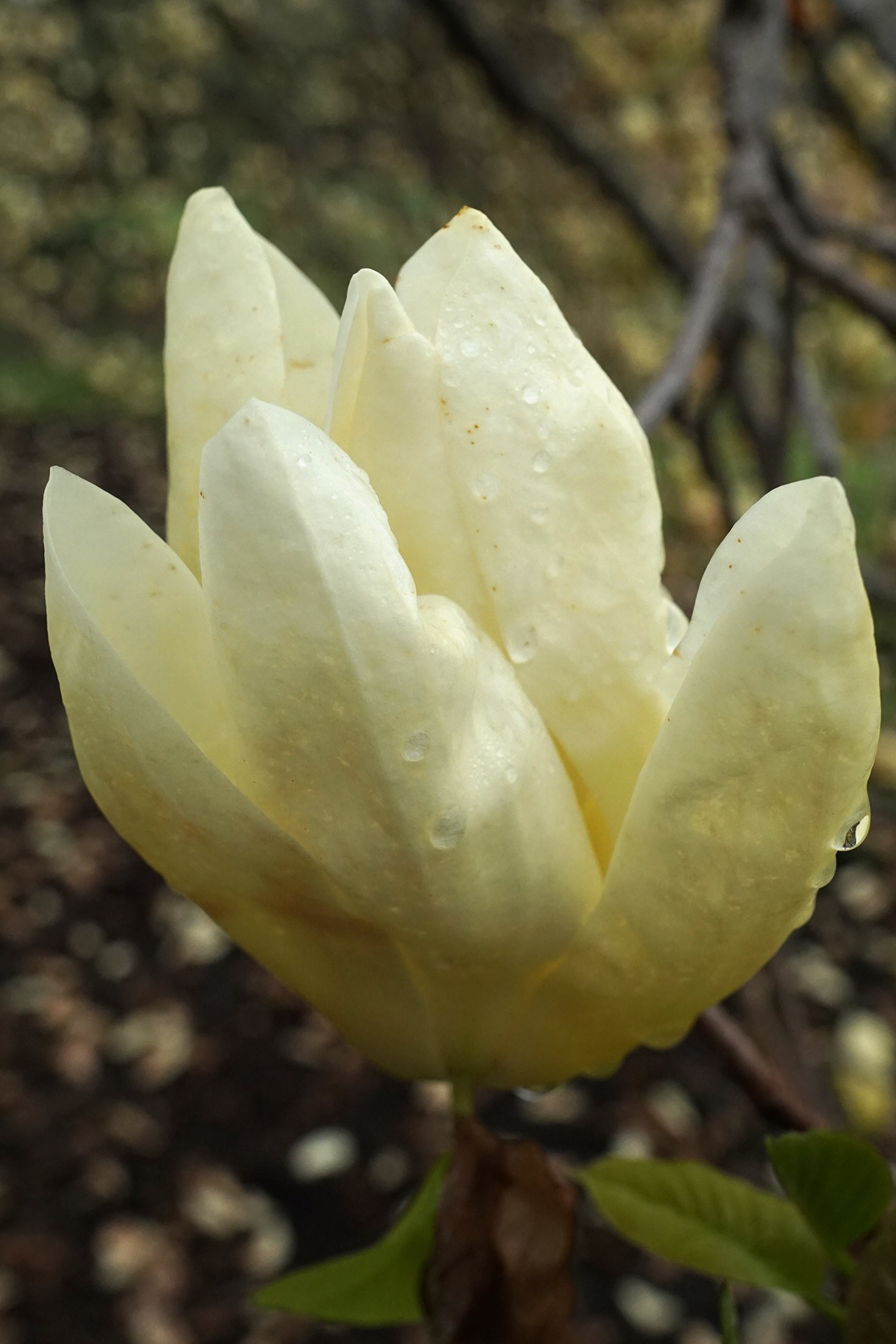
- Tepals are creamy-yellow
- Genus: Magnolia
- Hybrid parentage: Magnolia acuminata × M. denudata
- Cultivar: 'Elizabeth'
- Breeder: Brooklyn Botanic Garden

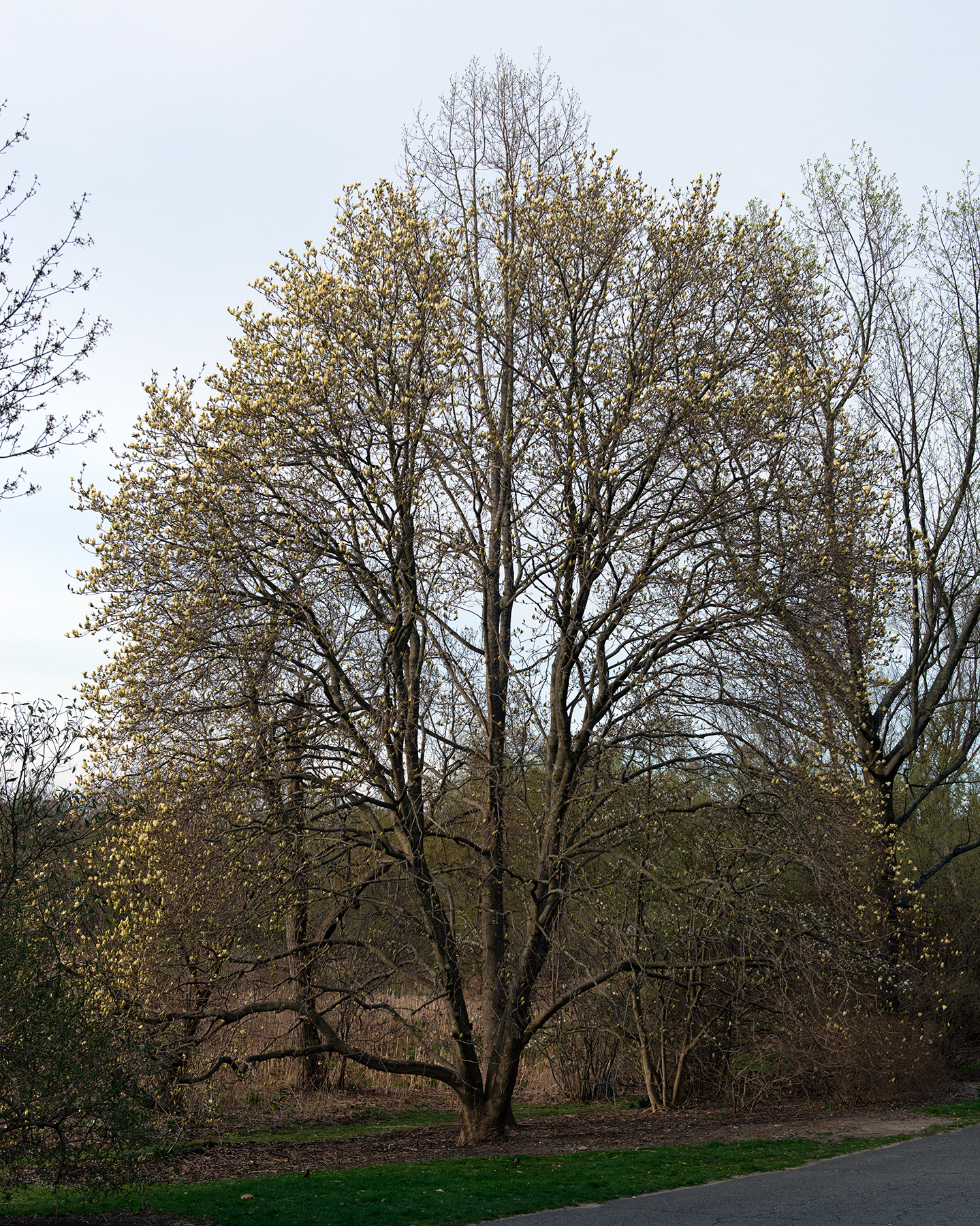
Flowers emerge before leaves

Magnolia 'Elizabeth' is a hybrid Magnolia that is the offspring of a cross between Magnolia acuminata (cucumbertree) and Magnolia denudata (Yulan magnolia). It is the result of a breeding program to create yellow-flowered varieties conducted at the Brooklyn Botanic Garden beginning in 1953, and was named for Elizabeth Van Brunt, who donated funds to the Brooklyn Botanic Garden.

== In cultivation ==
Magnolia 'Elizabeth' is a deciduous tree typically 20 to 35 ft (6 to 11 m) tall and spreading to 12 to 20 ft (4 to 6 m) wide. It is hardy in USDA zones 5 through 8, and is air‑pollution tolerant. Its Plant Patent was granted in 1977. With its cream to pale yellow flowers, Magnolia 'Elizabeth' gained the Royal Horticultural Society's Award of Garden Merit in 1993. Unlike species magnolias, it is approved for planting in New York City streets and parks.
