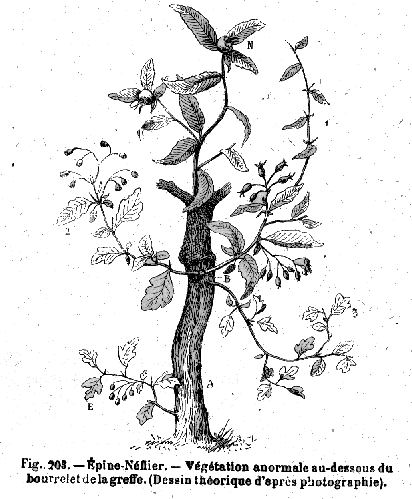

Scientific classification
- Kingdom: Plantae
- Clade: Tracheophytes
- Clade: Angiosperms
- Clade: Eudicots
- Clade: Rosids
- Order: Rosales
- Family: Rosaceae
- Subfamily: Amygdaloideae
- Tribe: Maleae
- Subtribe: Malinae
- Genus: + Crataegomespilus; Simon-Louis ex Bellair

Cultivars
- +Crataegomespilus 'Dardarii'; +Crataegomespilus 'Jules d'Asnieres'

= + Crataegomespilus =

+ Crataegomespilus is the generic name applied to graft-chimeras between the genera Crataegus and Mespilus. It should not be confused with × Crataemespilus, which is applied to sexual hybrids between those genera, nor with Chamaemespilus which is a segregate genus or subgenus of Sorbus.

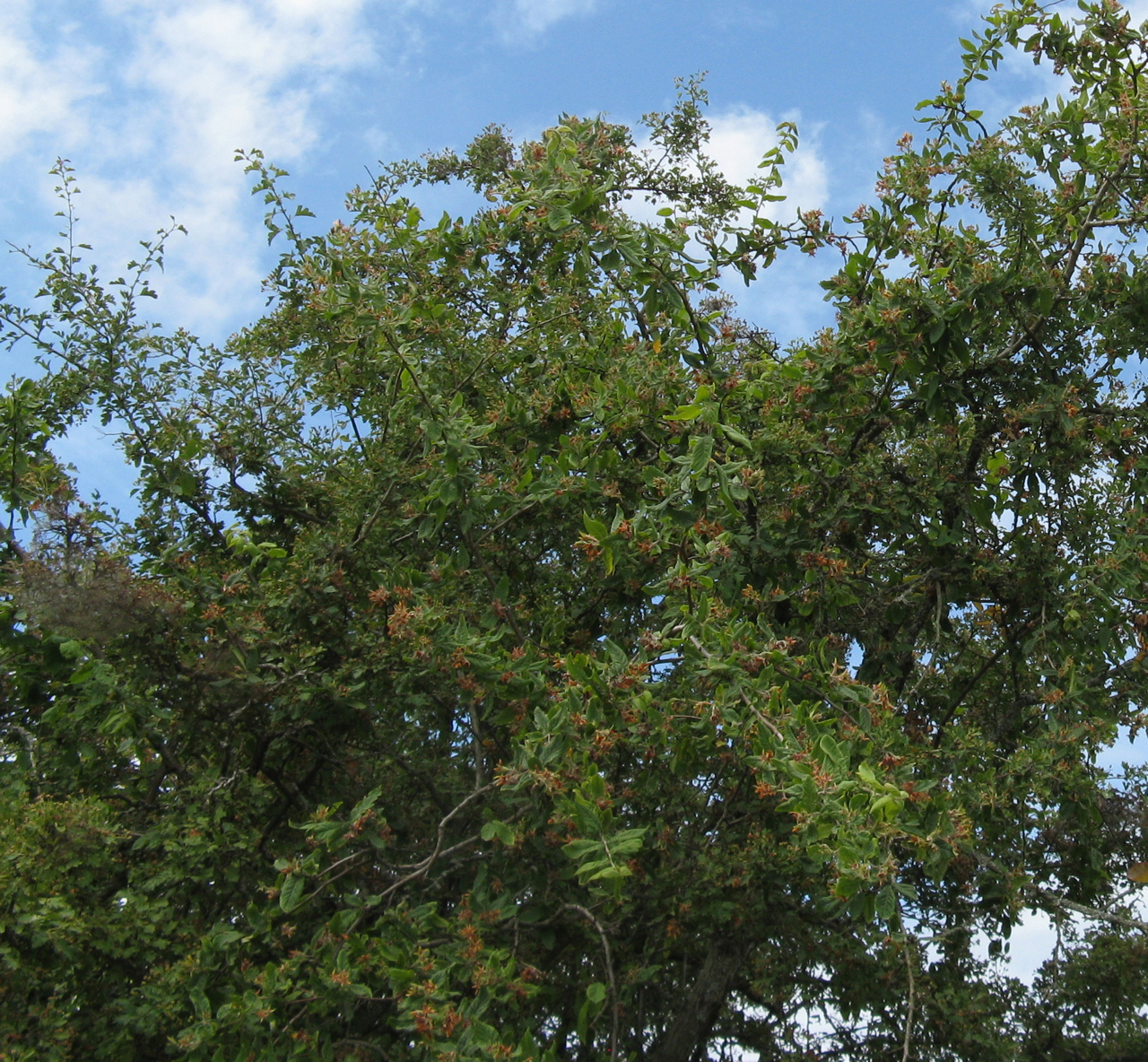
+ Crataegomespilus dardarii originated from Mespilus germanica grafted onto a rootstock of Crataegus monogyna.
