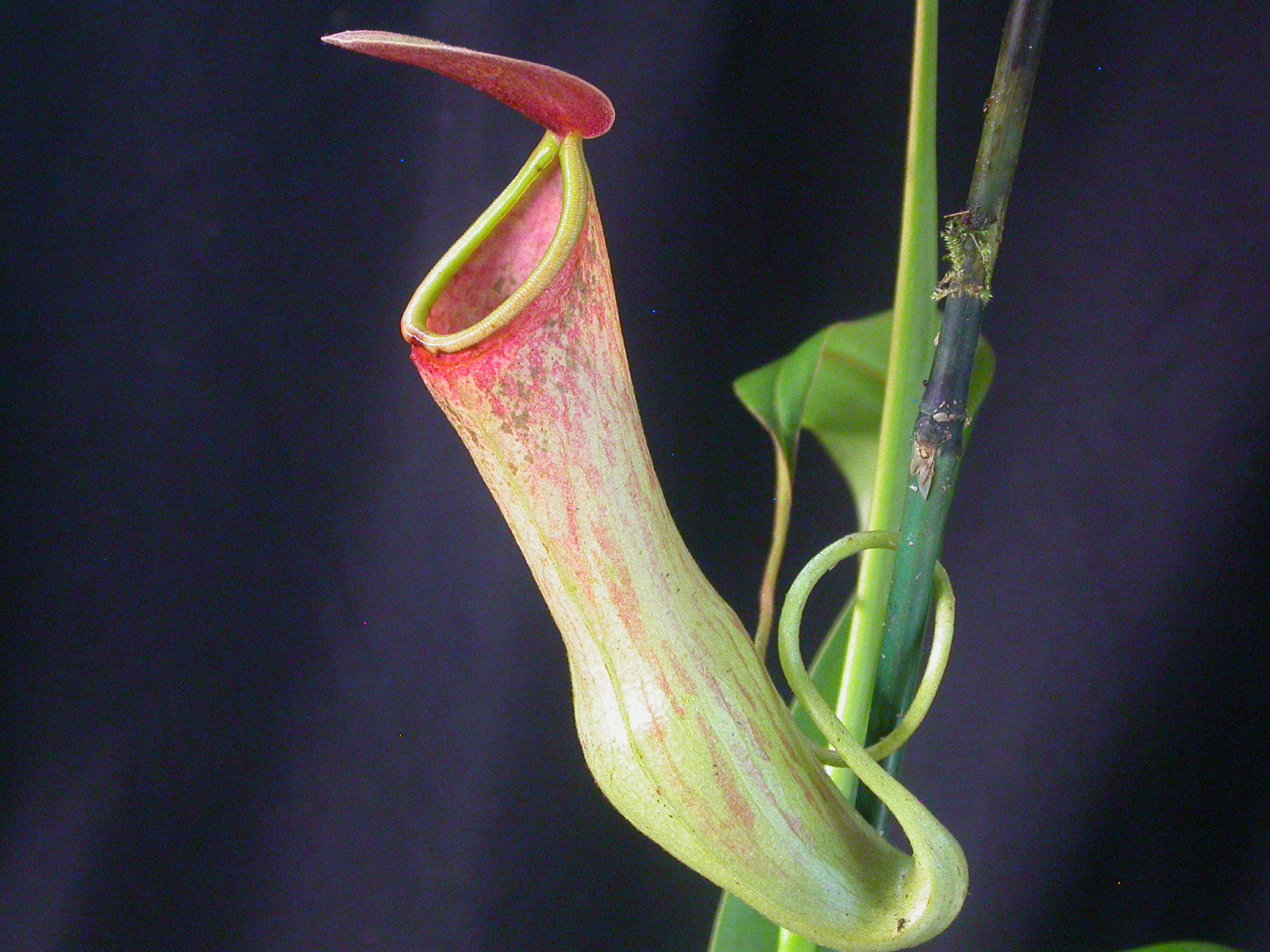
- Nepenthes khasiana. Cultivated plant.

Conservation status
- Endangered (IUCN 3.1)
- CITES Appendix I

Scientific classification
- Kingdom: Plantae
- Clade: Tracheophytes
- Clade: Angiosperms
- Clade: Eudicots
- Order: Caryophyllales
- Family: Nepenthaceae
- Genus: Nepenthes
- Species: N. khasiana

Binomial name
- Nepenthes khasiana Hook.f. (1873)
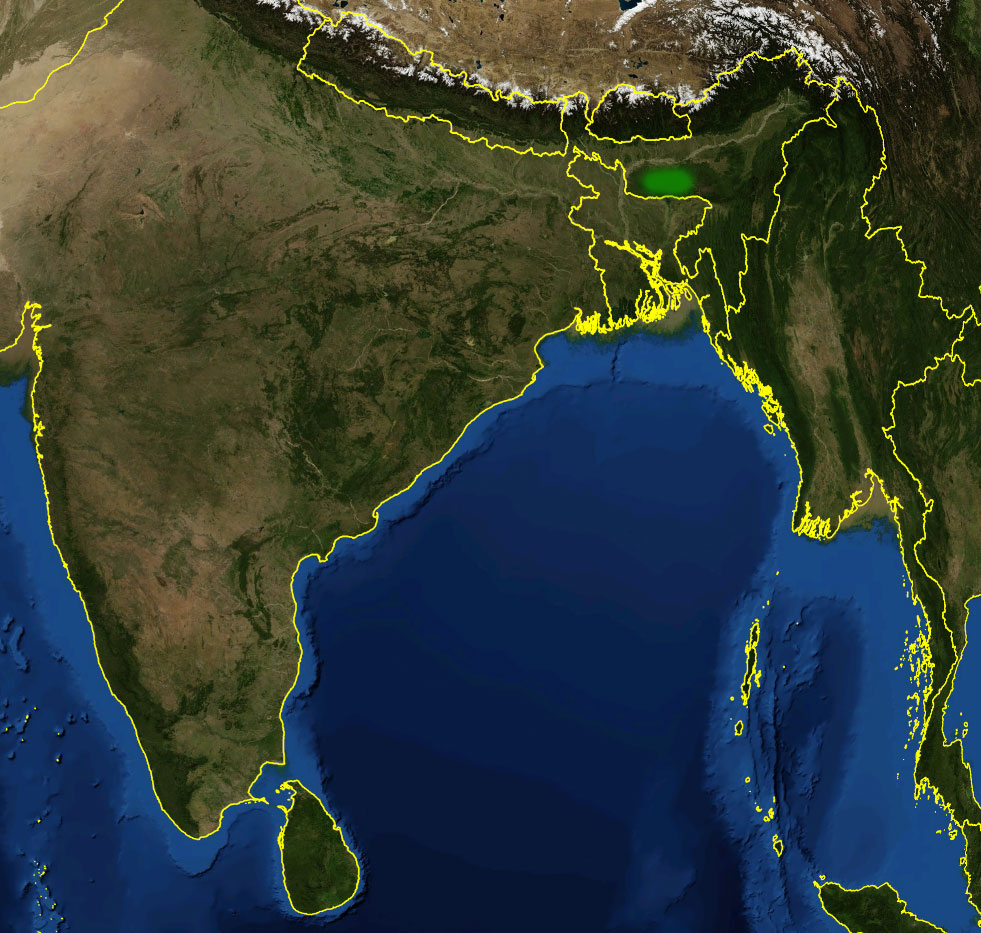
- Satellite image of the Indian subcontinent with the distribution of N. khasiana highlighted in green.

Synonyms
- Synonyms: Nepenthes distillatoria auct. non L.: R.Grah. (1827); Nepenthes melamphora auct. non Reinw. ex Blume: Hook.f. (1859) [=N. gymnamphora/N. khasiana]; Nepenthes phyllamphora auct. non Willd.: Regel (1881) [=N. khasiana/N. mirabilis]; Nepenthes phyllamphora auct. non Willd.: Sims (1826); Nepenthes rubra Hort.Van Houtte ex Rafarin (1869)

= Nepenthes khasiana =

Species of pitcher plant from India

Nepenthes khasiana (/nɪˈpɛnθiːz ˌxæsiˈɑːnə/; after the Khasi Hills, to which it is largely endemic) is an endangered tropical pitcher plant of the genus Nepenthes. It is the only Nepenthes species native to India. It is thought to attract prey by means of blue fluorescence.

== Distribution ==
The species has a very localised distribution and is rare in the wild. But with new advancement in agro-technology and tissue culture, it is now being cultivated in campus of Nagaland University, Nagaland. These Pitcher Plants which are endemic to Meghalaya can be seen widely as decorative plants outside many houses of Nagaland.

Isolated populations are known to occur in the Jarain area of the Jaintia Hills, the Baghmara area of the Garo Hills, adjacent to the Khasi Hills region of Meghalaya, in the Upper Kharthong area, of Dima Hasao district Assam and in some parts of Nagaland.

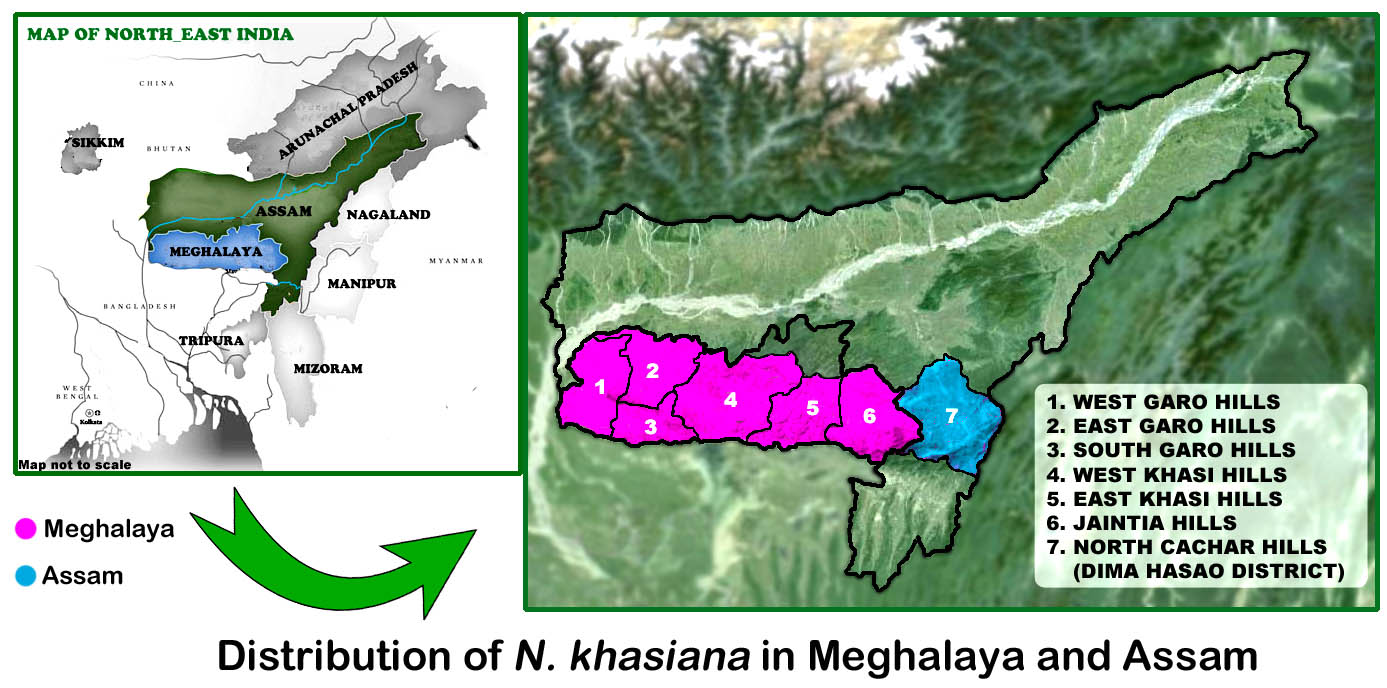

Nevertheless, N. khasiana exhibits considerable genetic diversity. The Khasi people call the plant tiew-rakot, which means demon-flower or devouring-plant. The Jaintias call it kset phare, which is roughly translated as lidded fly net. The Garo call the plant memang-koksi, which literally means the basket of the devil and the Biate tribe of Assam call the plant Jug-Par which means Jug-flower or Loisul Kola which literally means Pitcher-plant.

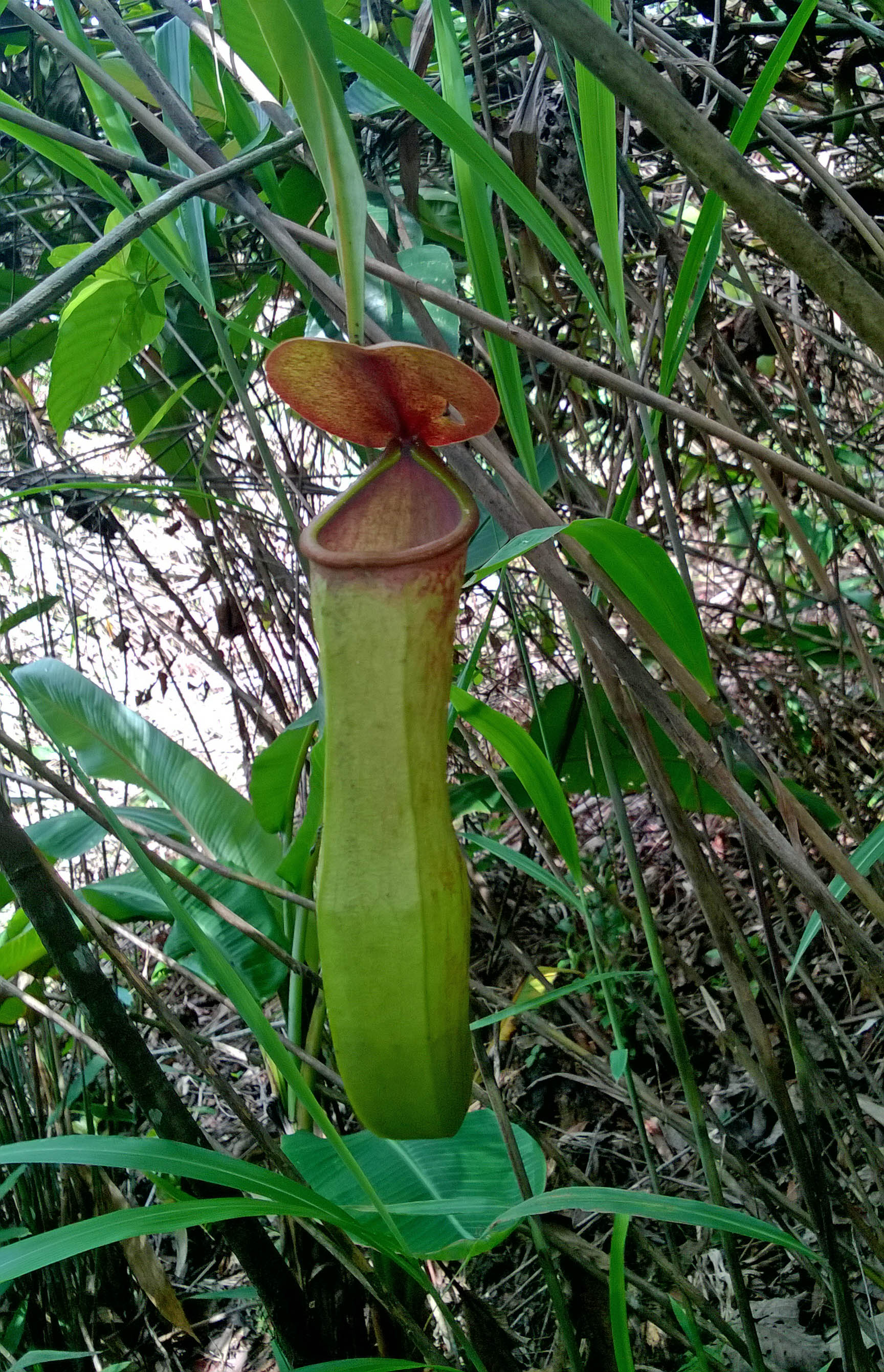
A Pitcher plant from Vaitang Hebron village, Dima Hasao district, Assam, India

== Conservation status ==
Nepenthes khasiana is a protected species, classified as endangered, and is listed under CITES Appendix I meaning commercial international trade is prohibited. Threats to wild populations include habitat destruction, acid mine drainage associated with coal mining, and collection for medicinal and ornamental uses. In 2010, the Rare Nepenthes Collection was established with the aim of conserving 4 of the most threatened Nepenthes species: N. aristolochioides, N. clipeata, N. khasiana, and N. rigidifolia.

== Etymology ==
The specific epithet khasiana is spelled khasyana in some older texts. This spelling actually predates that under which the species was formally published in Joseph Dalton Hooker's 1873 monograph, "Nepenthaceae", as it appeared in an article by Maxwell T. Masters in the April 20, 1872 issue of The Gardeners' Chronicle and Agricultural Gazette (this article was itself based on the manuscript of Hooker's monograph). In the horticultural trade of the late 19th century, N. khasiana was often confused with N. distillatoria of Sri Lanka.

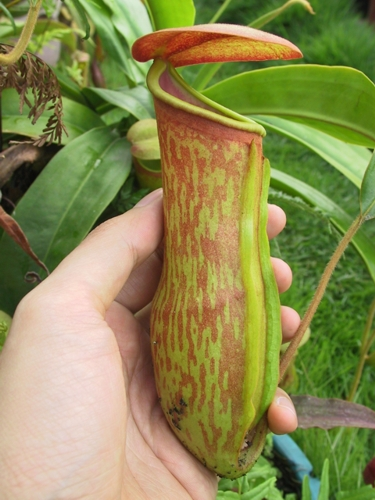
Intermediate pitcher of cultivated mature plant

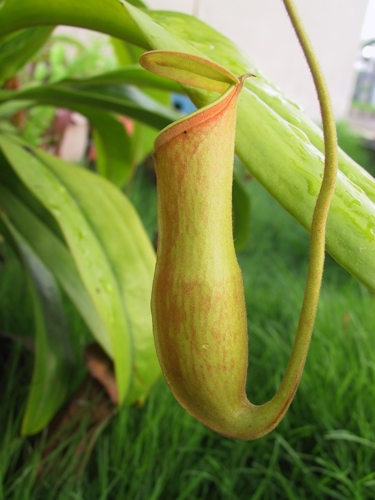
Upper pitcher of cultivated mature plant
