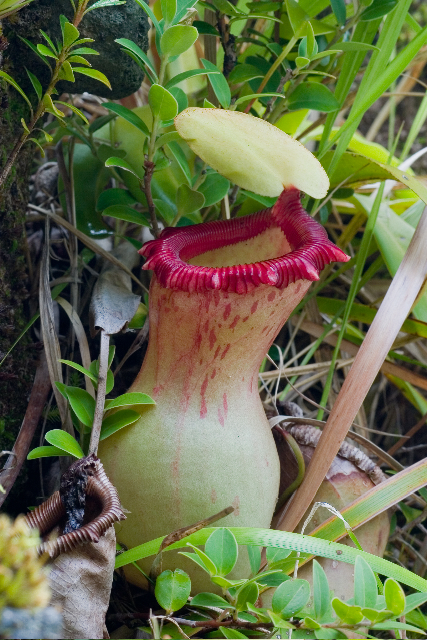
- Nepenthes ventricosa in habitat. Mayon Volcano, Luzon.

Conservation status
- Least Concern (IUCN 3.1)

Scientific classification
- Kingdom: Plantae
- Clade: Tracheophytes
- Clade: Angiosperms
- Clade: Eudicots
- Order: Caryophyllales
- Family: Nepenthaceae
- Genus: Nepenthes
- Species: N. ventricosa

Binomial name
- Nepenthes ventricosa Blanco (1837)

= Nepenthes ventricosa =

Species of pitcher plant from the Philippines

Nepenthes ventricosa (/nɪˈpɛnθiːz vɛntrɪˈkoʊzə/; from Neo-Latin ventricosus "having a swelling on one side") is a tropical pitcher plant endemic to the Philippines, where it is a highland species, growing at an elevation of 1,000–2,000 metres (3,300–6,600 ft) above sea level. It has been recorded from the islands of Luzon, Panay, and Sibuyan. The pitchers are numerous, growing up to 20 centimetres (8 in) tall and ranging in colour from ivory white to red.

Nepenthes ventricosa is very closely related to both N. burkei and N. sibuyanensis, but can be distinguished by a more waisted middle to the pitchers, a smaller mouth, and, generally, a thinner peristome.

== Infraspecific taxa ==
- Nepenthes ventricosa f. luteoviridis Hort. ex Y.Fukatsu (1999) nom.nud.

== Natural hybrids ==
- N. alata × N. ventricosa [=N. × ventrata]
