= International Code of Nomenclature for Cultivated Plants =

Guide for naming cultivated plant varieties

- Editors: Christopher D. Brickell, Crinan Alexander, Janet J. Cubey, John C. David, Marco H.A. Hoffman, Alan C. Leslie, Valéry Malécot, Xiaobai Jin, et al.
- Language: English
- Release number: 9
- Subject: Cultivated plant taxonomy
- Published: International Society for Horticultural Science (June 2016)
- Publication place: The Netherlands
- Media type: Print
- Pages: 190
- ISBN: 978-94-6261-116-0 (9th ed.)
- Preceded by: 8th edition (October 2009)
- Website: www.ishs.org/scripta-horticulturae/international-code-nomenclature-cultivated-plants-ninth-edition

The International Code of Nomenclature for Cultivated Plants (ICNCP) is a guide to the rules and regulations for naming cultigens, plants whose origin or selection is primarily due to intentional human activity. It is also known as Cultivated Plant Code. Cultigens under the purview of the ICNCP include cultivars, Groups (cultivar groups), and grexes. All organisms traditionally considered to be plants (including algae and fungi) are included. Taxa that receive a name under the ICNCP will also be included within taxa named under the International Code of Nomenclature for algae, fungi, and plants, for example, a cultivar is a member of a species.

== Brief history ==
The first edition of the ICNCP, which was agreed in 1952 in Wageningen and published in 1953, has been followed by seven subsequent editions – in 1958 (Utrecht), 1961 (update of 1958), 1969 (Edinburgh), 1980 (Seattle), 1995 (Edinburgh), 2004 (Toronto) and 2009 (Wageningen). The ninth (most recent) edition was published in 2016 (Beijing).

William Stearn has outlined the origins of ICNCP, tracing it back to the International Horticultural Congress of Brussels in 1864, when a letter from Alphonse de Candolle to Edouard Morren was tabled. This set out de Candolle's view that Latin names should be reserved for species and varieties found in the wild, with non-Latin or "fancy" names used for garden forms. Karl Koch supported this position at the 1865 International Botanical and Horticultural Congress and at the 1866 International Botanical Congress, where he suggested that future congresses should deal with nomenclatural matters. De Candolle, who had a legal background, drew up the Lois de la Nomenclature botanique (rules of botanical nomenclature). When adopted by the International Botanical Congress of Paris in 1867, this became the first version of today's International Code of Nomenclature for algae, fungi, and plants (ICN).

Article 40 of the Lois de la Nomenclature botanique dealt with the names of plants of horticultural origin:

Among cultivated plants, seedlings, crosses [métis] of uncertain origin and sports, receive fancy names in common language, as distinct as possible from the Latin names of species or varieties. When they can be traced back to a botanical species, subspecies or variety, this is indicated by a sequence of names (Pelargonium zonale Mistress-Pollock). (Note: "Dans les plantes cultivées, les semis, les métis d'origin obscure et les sports, reçoivent des noms de fantaisie, en langue vulgaire, aussi différents que possible des noms latins d'espèces ou de variétés. Quand on peut les rattacher à une espèce, à une sous espèce ou une variété botanique, on l'indique par la succession des noms (Pelargonium zonale Mistress-Pollock)." In the modern style the species name would be italicized and the cultivar name (fancy name) put in quotes, e.g. Pelargonium zonale 'Mistress Pollock'.)

This Article survived redrafting of the International Rules of Botanical Nomenclature until 1935 and its core sentiments remain in the present-day ICNCP of 2009.

The first version (1953) was published by the Royal Horticultural Society as a 29-page booklet, edited by William Stearn. Following the structure of the Botanical Code, the ICNCP is set out in the form of an initial set of Principles followed by Rules and Recommendations that are subdivided into Articles. Amendments to the ICNCP are prompted by international symposia for cultivated plant taxonomy which allow for rulings made by the International Commission on the Nomenclature of Cultivated Plants. Each new version includes a summary of the changes made to the previous version; the changes have also been summarised for the period 1953 to 1995.

== Name examples ==
The ICNCP operates within the framework of the International Code of Nomenclature for algae, fungi, and plants which regulates the scientific names of plants. The following are some examples of names governed by the ICNCP:

- Clematis alpina 'Ruby': a cultivar within a species; the cultivar epithet is in single quotes and capitalized.
- Magnolia 'Elizabeth': a selected clone (cultivar) among a pool of hybrids between two species, Magnolia acuminata (cucumbertree) and Magnolia denudata (Yulan magnolia).
- Rhododendron boothii Mishmiense Group: a cultivar group name; both the name of the cultivar group and the word "Group" are capitalized and not enclosed in quotes.
- Paphiopedilum Maudiae 'The Queen': a combination of grex name and cultivar name; the name of the grex is capitalized, and may be followed by a clonal (cultivar) name such as 'The Queen' in this case. Paphiopedilum Maudiae is a hybrid between Paphiopedilum callosum and Paphiopedilum lawrenceanum. 'The Queen' is a selected clone (cultivar).
- Apple 'Jonathan': permitted use of an unambiguous common name with a cultivar epithet.
- + Crataegomespilus: a graft-chimera of Crataegus and Mespilus

Note that the ICNCP does not regulate trademarks for plants: trademarks are regulated by the law of the land involved. Nor does the ICNCP regulate the naming of plant varieties in the legal sense of that term.

== Trade designations ==
Many plants have "selling names" or "marketing names" as well as a cultivar name; the ICNCP refers to these as "trade designations". Only the cultivar name is governed by the ICNCP. It is required to be unique; in accordance with the principle of priority, it will be the first name that is published or that is registered by the discoverer or breeder of the cultivar. Trade designations are not regulated by the ICNCP; they may be different in different countries. Thus the German rose breeder Reimer Kordes registered a white rose in 1958 as the cultivar 'KORbin'. This is sold in the United Kingdom under the selling name "Iceberg", in France as "Fée des Neiges" and in Germany as "Schneewittchen".

Trade designations are not enclosed in single quotes. The ICNCP states that "trade designations must always be distinguished typographically from cultivar, Group and grex epithets." It uses small capitals for this purpose, thus Syringa vulgaris Ludwig Spaeth (trade designation) is distinguished from S. vulgaris 'Andenken an Ludwig Späth' (cultivar name). Other sources, including the Royal Horticultural Society, instead use a different font for selling names, e.g. Rosa Iceberg 'KORbin'.

== See also ==
- Cultigen
- Cultivated plant taxonomy
- International Code of Nomenclature for algae, fungi, and plants
- International Cultivar Registration Authority

== Bibliography ==
- Beales, Peter (October 2011). "Last of the Roses". The Garden. 136 (10).
- Brickell, C.D.; et al., eds. (2009). "International Code of Nomenclature for Cultivated Plants" (PDF). Scripta Horticulturae. 10 (8th ed.). International Society of Horticultural Science: 1–184. ISBN 978-0-643-09440-6.
- Brickell, C.D.; et al., eds. (2016). "International Code of Nomenclature for Cultivated Plants" (PDF). Scripta Horticulturae. 18 (9th ed.). International Society of Horticultural Science. ISBN 978-94-6261-116-0.
- de Candolle, Alphonse (1867). Lois de la nomenclature botanique adoptées par le Congrès international de botanique, tenu à Paris en août 1867; suivies d'une 2e édition de l'introduction historique et du commentaire qui accompagnaient la rédaction préparatoire présentée au Congrès. Geneva and Basle: H. Georg. OCLC 17409844.
- Fletcher, H. R. (January–February 1957). "The International Commission for the Nomenclature of Cultivated Plants of the International Union of Biological Sciences, Report of the Inaugural Meeting at Utrecht from 21st–23rd November, 1". Taxon. 6 (1): 13–17. doi:10.1002/j.1996-8175.1957.tb02687.x. JSTOR 1217864.
- Spencer, R.D.; Cross, R.G. (2007). "The International Code of Botanical Nomenclature (ICBN), the International Code of Nomenclature for Cultivated Plants (ICNCP), and the cultigen". Taxon. 56 (3): 938–940. doi:10.2307/25065875. JSTOR 25065875.
- Stearn, William T. (1952). "Proposed International Code of Nomenclature for Cultivated Plants. Historical Introduction". Journal of the Royal Horticultural Society. 77: 157–173.
- Stearn, W. T. (7 September 1952a). International Code of Nomenclature for Cultivated Plants (Speech). Opening of the 13th International Horticultural Congress of London in September 1952. Bromeliad Society International. London. Archived from the original on 18 April 2016.
- Trehane, P. (2004). "50 years of the International Code of Nomenclature for Cultivated Plants: Future prospects for the Code". Acta Horticulturae. 634.
- Wyman, Donald (26 December 1956). "The new International Code of Nomenclature for Cultivated Plants" (PDF). Arnoldia. 18 (12): 63–68. Archived from the original (PDF) on 5 May 2017.
