= Nepenthes 'Alba' =

Cultivar of carnivorous plant

- Hybrid parentage: ((N. mirabilis × "N. thorelii") × N. mirabilis) × ("N. thorelii" × ((N. northiana × N. maxima) × (N. rafflesiana × N. veitchii)))
- Cultivar: Nepenthes 'Alba'; Hort.Bednar (1994)
- Origin: B.L.Bednar & O.C.Bramblett, 1990

Nepenthes 'Alba' is a cultivar of a complex manmade hybrid involving N. maxima, N. mirabilis, N. northiana, N. rafflesiana, N. veitchii, and a plant identified as N. thorelii.^{[note a]} It was bred by Bruce Lee Bednar and Orgel Clyde Bramblett in 1990. This cultivar name is not established as it was published without a description, violating Article 24.1 of the International Code of Nomenclature for Cultivated Plants, and has a Latin epithet, violating Article 19.13. It is a synonym of N. × hareliana and was originally published in the March 1994 issue of the Carnivorous Plant Newsletter as "x hareliana var. alba".

Other cultivars of the same cross include N. 'Boca Rose', N. 'Red Skeleton', N. 'Rouge', and N. 'Vittata'.

== See also ==
- List of Nepenthes cultivars

== Notes ==
a. Nepenthes thorelii is a poorly known Indochinese species with a confused horticultural history. The name has been widely applied to cultivated plants, but it is not certain whether the species exists in cultivation at all. Numerous artificial hybrids long thought to involve N. thorelii likely represent crosses with other Indochinese species of the "N. thorelii aggregate"—particularly N. bokorensis, N. kampotiana, and N. smilesii, as these were the most accessible to plant collectors—or hybrids thereof.
