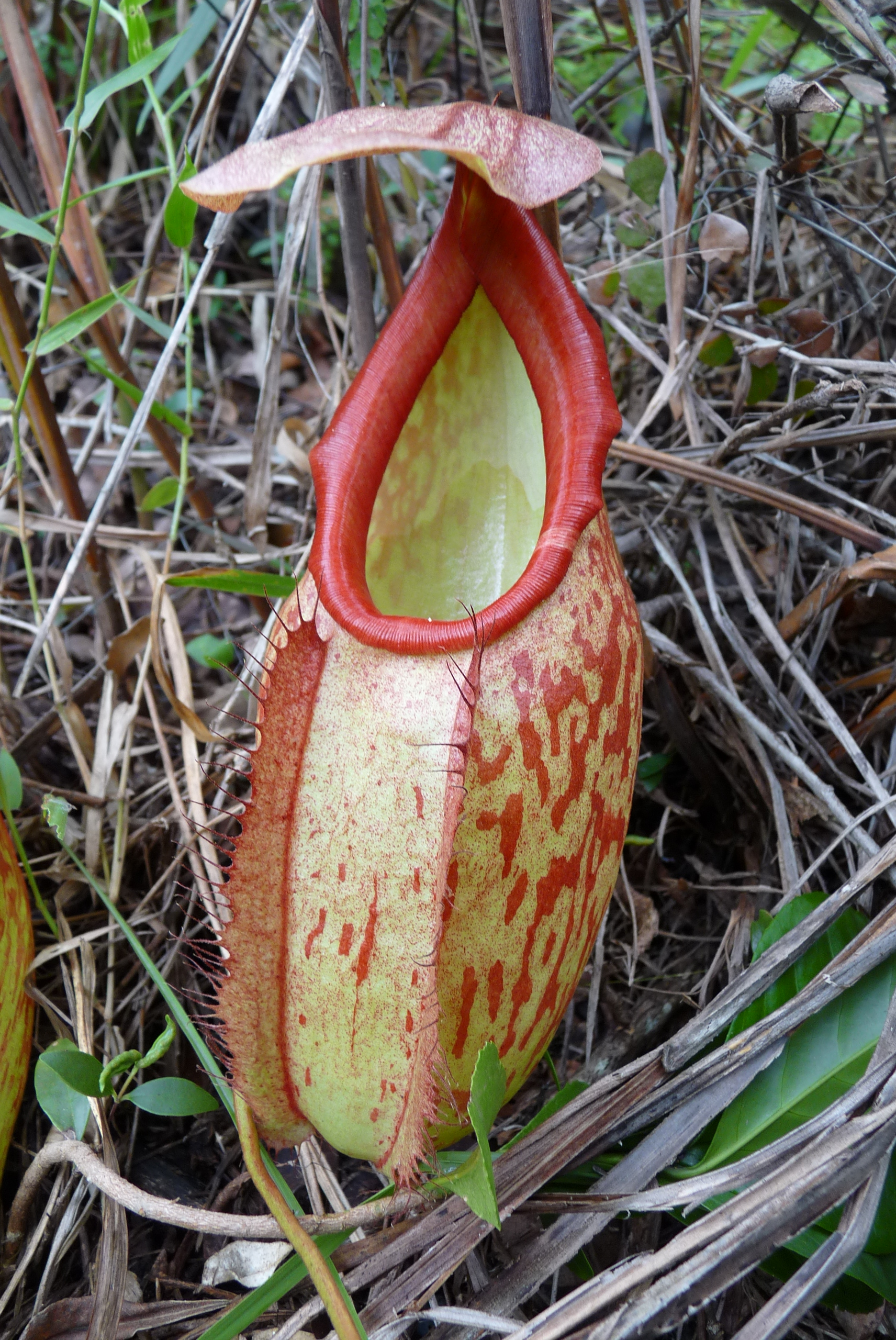
- A lower pitcher of N. holdenii

Scientific classification
- Kingdom: Plantae
- Clade: Tracheophytes
- Clade: Angiosperms
- Clade: Eudicots
- Order: Caryophyllales
- Family: Nepenthaceae
- Genus: Nepenthes
- Species: N. holdenii

Binomial name
- Nepenthes holdenii Mey (2010)

= Nepenthes holdenii =

Species of pitcher plant from Cambodia

Nepenthes holdenii is a tropical pitcher plant from western Cambodia, where it grows at elevations of 600–800 m above sea level. The species was originally known from only two peaks in the Cardamom Mountains, but the discovery of a new population was reported in October 2011. Seeds were collected in 2014 and the species was successfully introduced into cultivation.

== Physical Description ==
Leaves are coriaceous, subpetiolate, lamina linear to linear-lanceolate, 25–40 cm long, 3.5–6 cm wide, apex acute, clasping the stem by 1/2 of its circumference, decurrent on rosette and on climbing stem on 3–4 cm projecting from the stem as wings. There are three longitudinal nerves (rarely 4) on each side of the midrib in the outer third of the leaf. In the dry season, the leaves are modified into pitchers to capture and digest insects. The pitchers can reach up to 30 cm long. In contrast to other closely related species, it has long tendrils and globose lower pitchers.

The ground vine and roots live for many years. These roots are bumpy and can be up to 2.5 centimeters thick. New leaves and stems grow each year. Climbing stems can grow up to 5 meters during the rainy season. During the dry season, most leaves and stems die because of heat and fire. The stem is round, shiny, and can be 6 to 8 millimeters wide. Leaf stems, called internodes, can vary in size. The stems on ground leaves are shorter, usually measuring 2 to 3 centimeters. On climbing stems, they are longer, usually measuring 5 to 6 centimeters.

== Functional Characteristics ==
Nepenthes holdenii is carnivorous and fire-adapted plant (pyrophytic). It uses its pitcher-shaped leaves to trap insects and has a thick underground tuber that helps it survive drought and wildfires in its dry, nutrient-poor habitat.

N. holdenii primarily feeds on insects, similar to other species in the Nepenthes genus. Although this specific species was not analyzed in detail, studies on related species show that the pitcher fluid contains digestive enzymes like proteases, chitinases, phosphatases, and glucanases. These enzymes help break down proteins and other biopolymers, such a chitin from insect exoskeletons. The plant attracts prey with nectar secreted at the rim (peristome). When the peristome becomes wet, it turns extremely slippery, causing insects to slip and fall into the pitcher. Once inside, smooth walls and digestive fluid prevent escape. The insects are digested by enzymes in the fluid.

== Habitat and Distribution ==
Nepenthes holdenii occurs in localities situated in the transitional zone between lowland evergreen forest and low montane evergreen forest. The researchers found the pitcher plant in two separate places in the Cardamom mountains, but they have decided not to share the exact location to protect the species. They reported that the pitcher plants were found between 600 and 800 meters above sea level. The mountains on which N. holdenii was found are in the Pursat Province of Cambodia, in Phnom Kravanh (the Cardamom Mountains). This range extends along the Cambodian border, and it contains a varied landscape of isolated mountains and low hills. This area experiences a tropical monsoon climate, with distinct rainy and dry seasons.

== Etymology ==
It was previously collected and diagnosed by Lecomte in the 1909 as Nepenthes thorelii, which is now considered an aggregate of Indochinese Nepenthes species. It was photographed by biologist Jeremy Holden in 2006; Mey used these photographs, in situ examination of closely related species, and the previously collected specimen to distinguish N. holdenii from N. thorelii.

== Closely Related Species ==
These species are considered to be part of the Nepenthes thorelii aggregate.

- N. andamana M. Catal. (2010)
- N. bokorensis Mey (2009)
- N. chang M. Catal. (2010)
- N. kampotiana Lecomte (1909)
- N. kerrii M. Catal. & T. Kruetr. (2010)
- N. smilesii Hemsley (1897)
- N. suratensis M. Catal. (2010)
- N. thorelii Lecomte (1909)
