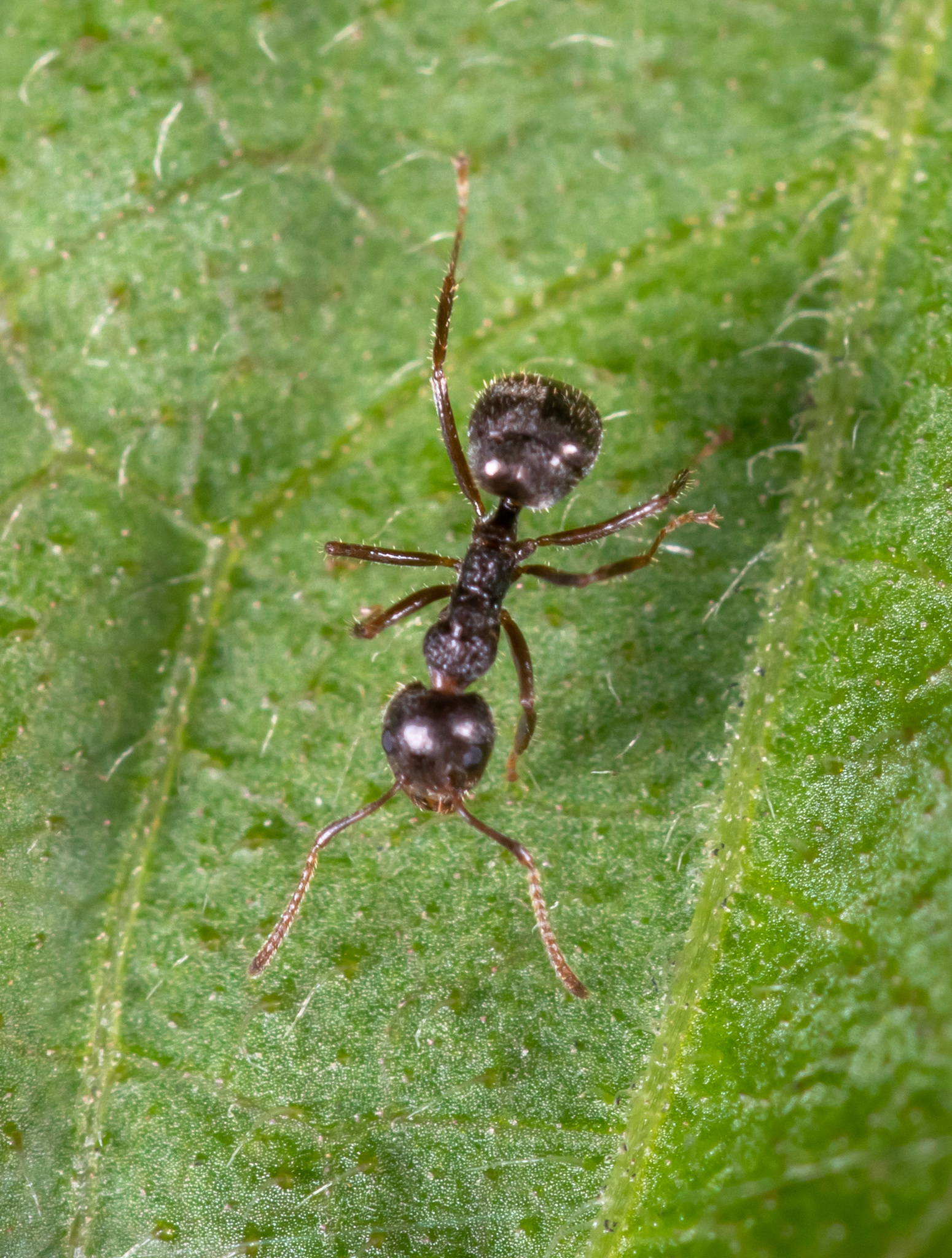

Scientific classification
- Domain: Eukaryota
- Kingdom: Animalia
- Phylum: Arthropoda
- Class: Insecta
- Order: Hymenoptera
- Family: Formicidae
- Subfamily: Dolichoderinae
- Genus: Dolichoderus
- Species: D. thoracicus

Binomial name
- Dolichoderus thoracicus (Smith, F., 1860)

Subspecies
- Dolichoderus thoracicus bilikanus Santschi, 1925; Dolichoderus thoracicus borneonensis Roger, 1863; Dolichoderus thoracicus lacciperdus Santschi, 1925; Dolichoderus thoracicus levior Karavaiev, 1926; Dolichoderus thoracicus nasutus Karavaiev, 1935; Dolichoderus thoracicus rufescens Stitz, 1925

Synonyms
- Dolichoderus bituberculatus emarginata Santschi, 1920; Hypoclinea bituberculata Mayr, 1862; Hypoclinea sellaris Roger, 1863

= Dolichoderus thoracicus =

Species of ant

Dolichoderus thoracicus is a species of ant in the genus Dolichoderus. Described by Smith in 1860, the species is widespread in Asia.
