= Paul Henri Lecomte =

French botanist (1856–1934)

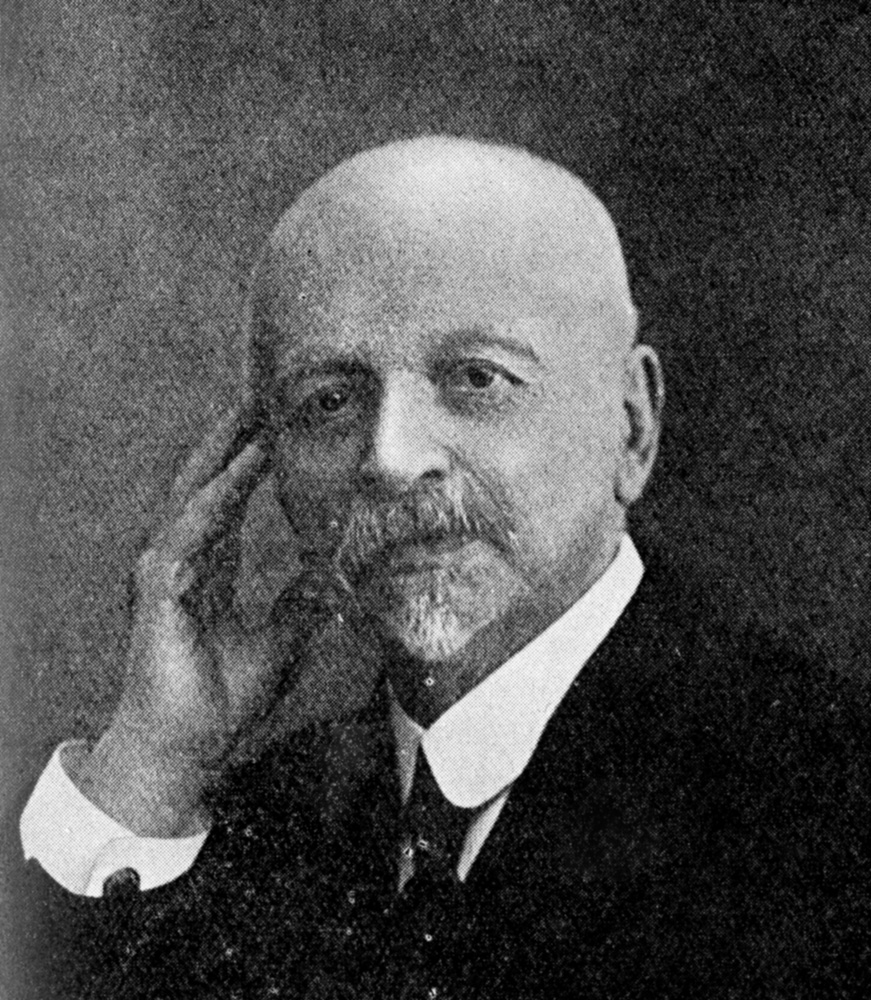
Paul Henri Lecomte.

Paul Henri Lecomte (8 January 1856, in Saint-Nabord, Vosges – 12 June 1934, in Paris) was a French botanist.

In 1884, after attaining a number of degrees, Lecomte became a professor at Lycée Saint-Louis in Paris. In addition to his teaching duties, he worked in the botany laboratory of the Muséum national d'histoire naturelle (French National Museum of Natural History) under Philippe van Tieghem. Lecomte obtained his doctorate in 1889 and subsequently took part in scientific expeditions to North Africa, Egypt, the Antilles, French Guiana and French Indo-China.

In 1906, after having volunteered his time for some twenty years at the Muséum national d'histoire naturelle, Lecomte was formally appointed to head the spermatophyte department, a paid position, succeeding Louis Édouard Bureau. In 1917, he was elected a member of the French Academy of Sciences. He authored over 15 books including: Notions de botanique ("Botanical Ideas"), Formation de la vanilline dans la vanille ("The Formation of Vanillin in Vanilla"), Les bois d’Indochine ("The Trees of Indo-China") and Madagascar: les bois de la forêt d'Analamazaotra ("Madagascar: The Trees and Flowers of Analamazaotra (Andasibe)"). He retired in 1931.
