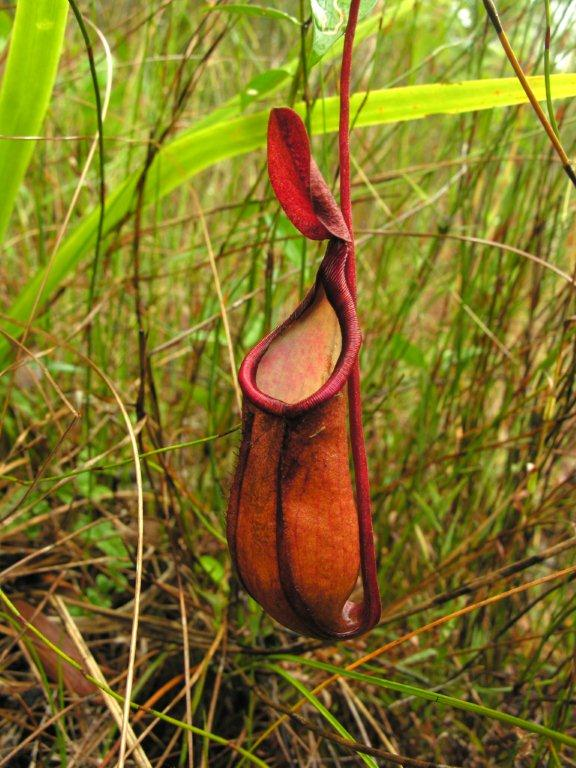
- A lower pitcher of N. kampotiana

Conservation status
- Least Concern (IUCN 3.1)

Scientific classification
- Kingdom: Plantae
- Clade: Tracheophytes
- Clade: Angiosperms
- Clade: Eudicots
- Order: Caryophyllales
- Family: Nepenthaceae
- Genus: Nepenthes
- Species: N. kampotiana

Binomial name
- Nepenthes kampotiana Lecomte (1909)

Synonyms
- Synonyms: Nepenthes geoffrayi Lecomte (1909); Heterochresonyms: Nepenthes kampotiana auct. non Lecomte: Hort. ex Hort.Bot.Berlin in sched. (1996) [=N. mirabilis]

= Nepenthes kampotiana =

Species of pitcher plant from Southeast Asia

Nepenthes kampotiana is a tropical pitcher plant native to southern Cambodia, eastern Thailand, and at least southern coastal Vietnam. It has an altitudinal distribution of 0–600 m above sea level. The specific epithet kampotiana refers to the Cambodian city of Kampot, close to which the first specimens of this species were collected.

This species is closely related to N. chang. Nepenthes geoffrayi is a heterotypic synonym of N. kampotiana.

In his Carnivorous Plant Database, taxonomist Jan Schlauer treats N. kampotiana as a heterotypic synonym of N. smilesii.

== Natural hybrids ==
- N. bokorensis × N. kampotiana
- N. kampotiana × N. mirabilis
