= Nepenthes parvula =

Conservation status
- Least Concern (IUCN 3.1)

Scientific classification
- Kingdom: Plantae
- Clade: Tracheophytes
- Clade: Angiosperms
- Clade: Eudicots
- Order: Caryophyllales
- Family: Nepenthaceae
- Genus: Nepenthes
- Species: N. parvula

Binomial name
- Nepenthes parvula Gary W.Wilson & S.Venter (2016)

Species of pitcher plant from Australia

Nepenthes parvula is a tropical pitcher plant native to the Cape York Peninsula of Queensland, Australia.

It is the fourth Nepenthes species recorded from the continent and its third endemic species. Nepenthes parvula is closely related to the three other Australian Nepenthes species: N. mirabilis, N. rowaniae and N. tenax.

The specific epithet parvula refers to the diminutive size of mature plants.
