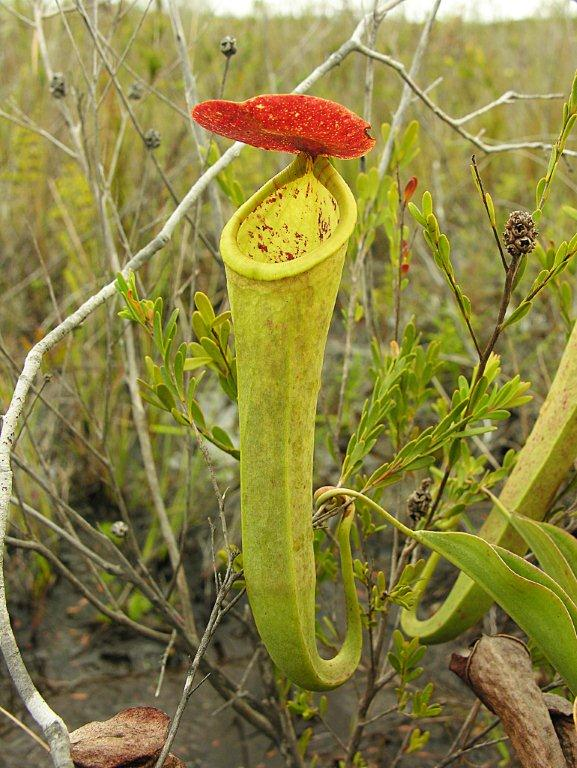
- An upper pitcher of N. tenax

Conservation status
- Least Concern (IUCN 3.1)

Scientific classification
- Kingdom: Plantae
- Clade: Tracheophytes
- Clade: Angiosperms
- Clade: Eudicots
- Order: Caryophyllales
- Family: Nepenthaceae
- Genus: Nepenthes
- Species: N. tenax

Binomial name
- Nepenthes tenax C.Clarke & R.Kruger (2006)

= Nepenthes tenax =

Species of pitcher plant from Australia

Nepenthes tenax (/nɪˈpɛnθiːz ˈtɛnæks/; from Latin: tenax "tenacious") is a lowland species of tropical pitcher plant native to northern Queensland, Australia. It is the third Nepenthes species recorded from the continent and its second endemic species. Nepenthes tenax is closely related to the three other Australian Nepenthes species: N. mirabilis, N. rowaniae and N. parvula.

Nepenthes tenax grows to a height of around 100 cm with pitchers rarely exceeding 15 cm. The stem is usually self-supporting. In its natural habitat, it is sympatric with N. mirabilis and N. rowaniae. Simple and complex natural hybrids involving both of these species have been found.

== Taxonomy ==
Nepenthes tenax was first described as a new species in 2006 by Charles Clarke and Rodney Kruger in the journal Austrobaileya. The holotype specimen was collected from the head of Cowal Creek near Cape York, Queensland. The specific epithet tenax comes from the Latin word meaning "tenacious", referring to the plant's ability to produce upright stems and pitchers that remain erect in open areas despite strong winds and without support from surrounding vegetation – a characteristic unique among pitcher plants.

The species had previously been included within the widespread N. mirabilis, but was recognised as distinct based on several morphological characteristics, including its erect rather than climbing growth habit, infundibular (funnel-shaped) pitchers, and subpetiolate leaves. While superficially resembling N. alicae (now considered synonymous with N. mirabilis), N. tenax can be distinguished by its shorter tendril length in rosette pitchers (up to 25 mm vs. 60 mm) and its distinctive curled tendrils that hold the upper portions of aerial pitchers above the leaf blade.

Two natural hybrids involving N. tenax have been documented in the wild: N. tenax × N. mirabilis, which is relatively common and can form large hybrid swarms, and the rarer N. tenax × N. rowanae.

Phylogenetic analyses indicate Nepenthes tenax forms part of a clade containing N. mirabilis and several other recently separated species, though its exact evolutionary relationships within this group remain uncertain. While recognised as morphologically distinct enough to warrant species status, its genetic proximity to N. mirabilis renders that species paraphyletic when N. tenax and similar segregate species are recognised as distinct.

== Description ==
Nepenthes tenax is a shrubby carnivorous pitcher plant that grows in a monopodial fashion, meaning new stems typically emerge from the rootstock after the main stem dies. Young parts of the plant are covered with simple and star-shaped hairs that generally fall off as the plant matures. The stems are cylindrical, reaching lengths of up to 0.5 metres (occasionally 1 metre), with a thickness of 2–6 mm. The plant produces two distinct types of leaves: rosette leaves at the base and leaves along the erect stems. The rosette leaves are stalkless and very narrow, reaching 60 mm in length. The stem leaves are lance-shaped and larger, growing up to 110 mm long, with a distinctive V-shaped cross-section.

Each leaf terminates in a tendril that supports a modified leaf structure known as a pitcher, which serves as a trap for catching prey. The plant produces two types of pitchers: rosette pitchers near the ground (though these are rare) and aerial pitchers higher up the plant. The rosette pitchers are ovoid to funnel-shaped and relatively small (up to 55 mm tall), featuring two wings with hair-like projections. The aerial pitchers are larger (up to 110 mm tall) and purely funnel-shaped, typically lacking wings.

Both pitcher types share several common features: a round, oblique mouth surrounded by a rigid rim (peristome) with fine ribs and minute teeth; and a lid that extends beyond the mouth's width, sitting close to the rim to create a narrow opening. The inner surfaces of the pitchers contain numerous small, round glands in their lower portions. The plant produces flowers in racemes (elongated clusters) up to 160 mm long. Individual flowers are small, with ovate sepals up to 4 mm in length. The mature fruit capsules reach approximately 12 mm in length.

== Distribution ==
Nepenthes tenax reside in the lower levels of the swamps on floodplains surrounding the Jardine River on the northern Cape York peninsula appear to be the only habitats for this species, which is reportedly restricted to open sandy substrates or saturated wetlands.

== Conservation ==
Nepenthes tenax maintains abundant populations within its native range around the Jardine River on Cape York Peninsula, Queensland, Australia, where it grows in permanently wet swamps and bogs at near sea-level elevations. The majority of its subpopulations are protected within Apudthama National Park. While the species faces potential threats from improper fire management and some illegal collection for horticulture, its overall population remains large and stable. Some subpopulations outside protected areas could be impacted by future mining or agricultural development. The species is listed under CITES Appendix II, which regulates international trade. Due to its abundance, stable population, and protected status, N. tenax is assessed as a least-concern species by the IUCN.
