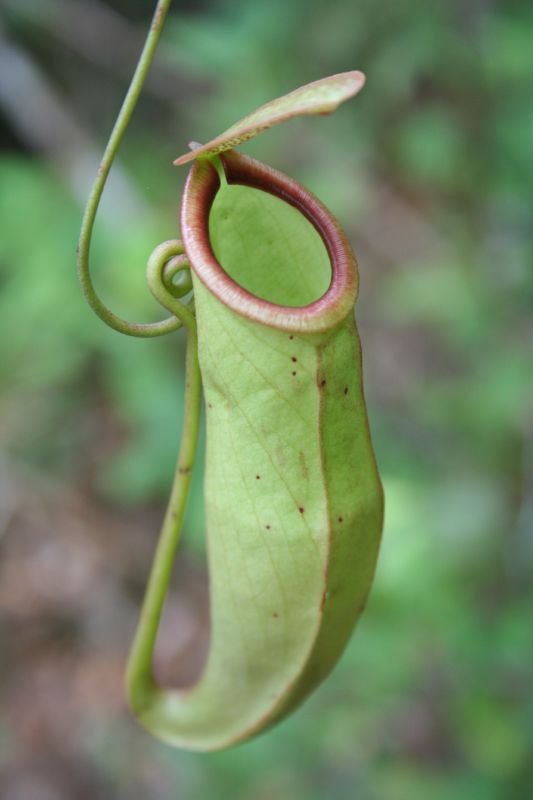
- An upper pitcher of Nepenthes mirabilis

Conservation status
- Least Concern (IUCN 3.1)

Scientific classification
- Kingdom: Plantae
- Clade: Tracheophytes
- Clade: Angiosperms
- Clade: Eudicots
- Order: Caryophyllales
- Family: Nepenthaceae
- Genus: Nepenthes
- Species: N. mirabilis

Binomial name
- Nepenthes mirabilis (Lour.) Druce (1869)^{[a]}
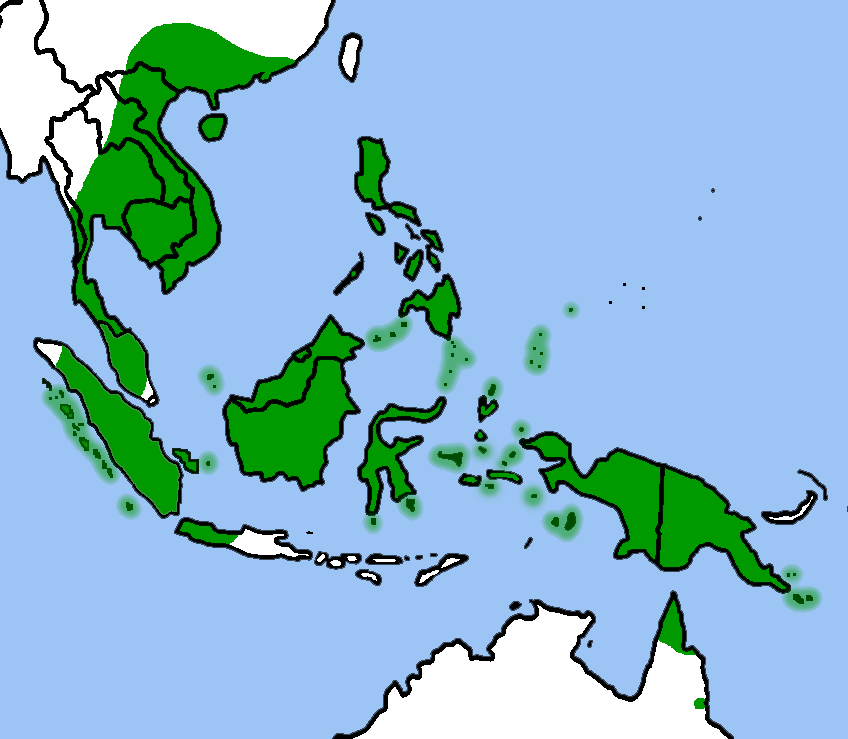
- Distribution of N. mirabilis.

Synonyms
- Synonyms: Nepenthes alata auct. non Blanco: Danser (1928) [=N. abalata/N. alata/N. benstonei/ N. copelandii/N. eustachya/N. graciliflora/ N. mindanaoensis/N. mirabilis/ N. negros/N. philippinensis]; Nepenthes albolineata F.M.Bail. (1898); Nepenthes alicae F.M.Bail. (1898); Nepenthes armbrustae F.M.Bail. (1905); ?Nepenthes beauvaisii A.Truffaut (1887) nom.nud.; Nepenthes bernaysii F.M.Bail. (1881); Nepenthes cantharifera Juss. ex Raf. (1835); Nepenthes cholmondeleyi F.M.Bail. (1900); Nepenthes distillatoria auct. non L.: Steud. (1841); Nepenthes echinostoma Hook.f. (1873); Nepenthes fimbriata Blume (1852); Nepenthes fimbriata var. leptostachya Blume (1852); Nepenthes garrawayae F.M.Bail. (1905); Nepenthes globosa Sh.Kurata (2007) nom.nud.; Nepenthes hainanensis Metcalfe & Chalk (1950) sphalm.typogr.; Nepenthes hainaniana Metcalfe & Chalk (1950) nom.nud.; Nepenthes hainensis Hort. ex Y.Fukatsu (1999) sphalm.typogr.; Nepenthes jardinei F.M.Bail. (1897); Nepenthes kampotiana auct. non Lecomte: Hort. ex Hort.Bot.Berlin in sched. (1996); Nepenthes kennedyana F.Muell. (1865); Nepenthes kennedyana var. rubra Hort.Ratcliff (1880) nom.nud.; Nepenthes kennedyi Benth. (1873) sphalm.typogr.; Nepenthes macrostachya Blume (1852); Nepenthes moluccensis Oken (1841); Nepenthes moorei F.M.Bail. (1898); Nepenthes obrieniana Linden & Rodigas (1890) nom.ambiguum [=?(N. gracilis × (N. rafflesiana × N. hirsuta)) × N. distillatoria/ N. gracilis/N. mirabilis]; Nepenthes pascoensis F.M.Bail. (1905); Nepenthes phyllamphora Willd. (1805) nom.illeg.; Nepenthes phyllamphora auct. non Willd.: Regel (1881) [=N. khasiana/N. mirabilis]; Nepenthes phyllamphora var. macrantha Hook.f. (1873); Nepenthes phyllamphora var. pediculata Lecomte (1909); Nepenthes phyllamphora var. platyphylla Blume (1852); Nepenthes phyllamphora var. speciosa Hort.Van Houtte ex Rafarin (1869); Nepenthes scyphus Juss. ex Raf. (1835); ?Nepenthes sinensis Hort.Bot.Goettingen in sched. (1998) nom.nud.; Nepenthes tubulosa Macfarl. (1908); Nepenthes vieillardii auct. non Hook.f.: Hort. ex Studnička (1989); ?Nepenthes viridis Hort. ex Teijsm. (1859) nom.nud.; Phyllamphora mirabilis Lour. (1790); Heterochresonyms: Nepenthes mirabilis auct. non (Lour.) Rafarin: Danser (1928) [=N. mirabilis/N. rowaniae]; Informal names: Nepenthes sp. Phanga Nga S.McPherson (2009); Nepenthes Viking M.Tada (2007); Pre-Linnaean names: "Cantharifera" Rumph. (1750)

= Nepenthes mirabilis =

Wide-ranging species of tropical pitcher plant

Nepenthes mirabilis (/nɪˈpɛnθiːz mɪˈræbɪlɪs/; from Latin mirabilis "wonderful") is a species of carnivorous plant in the family Nepenthaceae. It is sometimes referred to by the common names common swamp pitcher-plant and tropical pitcher plant.

By far the most widespread of all Nepenthes, its range covers continental Southeast Asia and all major islands of the Malay Archipelago (minus the Lesser Sunda Islands and northern Philippines), stretching from China in the north to Australia in the south. The species exhibits great variability throughout its range. One of the more notable varieties, N. mirabilis var. echinostoma, is endemic to Borneo and possesses an extremely wide peristome.

The conservation status of N. mirabilis is listed as Least Concern on the IUCN Red List. In Hong Kong, it is a protected species under Forestry Regulations Cap. 96A.

According to Matthew Jebb and Martin Cheek, the pitchers of N. mirabilis are used as toy phallocrypts in New Guinea.

== Distribution ==
Nepenthes mirabilis has by far the widest distribution of any Nepenthes species and is known from the following countries and regions: Australia (Cape York Peninsula), Borneo, Cambodia, Caroline Islands (Palau and Yap), China (Guangdong Province, Hainan, Hong Kong, and Macau), D'Entrecasteaux Islands, Java, Laos, Louisiade Archipelago, Maluku Islands, Myanmar, New Guinea, Peninsular Malaysia, Philippines (Dinagat and Mindanao), Sulawesi, Sumatra, Thailand, and Vietnam. It has also been recorded from many smaller islands, including Babi, Bangka, Banyak Islands, Batu Islands, Bengkalis, Enggano, Ko Lanta, Ko Tarutao, Langkawi, Mendol, Mentawai Islands (North Pagai, Siberut, Sipura, and South Pagai), Meranti Islands (Padang, Rangsang, and Tebing Tinggi), Nias, Penang, Phuket, Riau Islands (Lingga Islands and Riau Archipelago), Rupat, Tawi-Tawi, and possibly Wowoni.

== Taxonomy ==
Nepenthes mirabilis is closely related to N. rowaniae, N. tenax and N. parvula, the only three Nepenthes species endemic to Australia.

Differences between N. mirabilis and N. rowaniae (Clarke & Kruger, 2005)
Character	N. mirabilis	N. rowaniae
Morphology of leaf blade	Acute to rounded	Contracted towards the apex, then continuing along the tendril as a narrow, acute, extension
Insertion of tendril to leaf blade	Simple	Peltate
Pitcher wings	Simple, bearing multicellular fringe elements	Often flattened at front, forming a T-shape in XS, multicellular fringe elements often present
Leaf blade texture	Usually chartaceous	Strongly coriaceous
Leaf blade attachment to stem	Simple, or rarely decurrent for ⅓ the length of the internode	Decurrent for at least ½ the length of the internode, usually more
Gland density in lower portion of pitcher	1,600-2,500 / cm^{2}	Approximately 3,600 / cm^{2}
Position of pitcher hip in upper pitchers	Mid-way, to lower half	Upper quarter
Position of pitcher hip in lower pitchers	Lower third to quarter	Immediately beneath peristome

In his Carnivorous Plant Database, taxonomist Jan Schlauer treats N. kongkandana as a synonym of N. mirabilis.

== Infraspecific taxa ==
Across its range, N. mirabilis exhibits great variability in terms of pitcher morphology and colour, and it has the most synonyms of all Nepenthes species. The following forms and varieties of N. mirabilis have been described. With the exception of N. mirabilis var. echinostoma and N. mirabilis var. globosa, these taxa are not considered valid today.

- Nepenthes mirabilis f. anamensis (Hort.Weiner) Hort.Westphal (1991)
- Nepenthes mirabilis var. anamensis Hort.Weiner in sched. (1985) nom.nud.
- Nepenthes mirabilis var. biflora J.H.Adam & Wilcock (1992)
- Nepenthes mirabilis var. echinostoma (Hook.f.) Hort.Slack ex J.H.Adam & Wilcock (1992)
- Nepenthes mirabilis var. globosa M.Catal. (2010)
- Nepenthes mirabilis f. simensis (Hort.Weiner) Hort.Westphal (1991)
- Nepenthes mirabilis var. simensis Hort.Weiner in sched. (1985) nom.nud.
- Nepenthes mirabilis f. smilesii (Hemsl.) Hort.Westphal (2000)
- Nepenthes mirabilis var. smilesii (Hemsl.) Hort.Weiner in sched. (1985)

=== N. mirabilis var. echinostoma ===
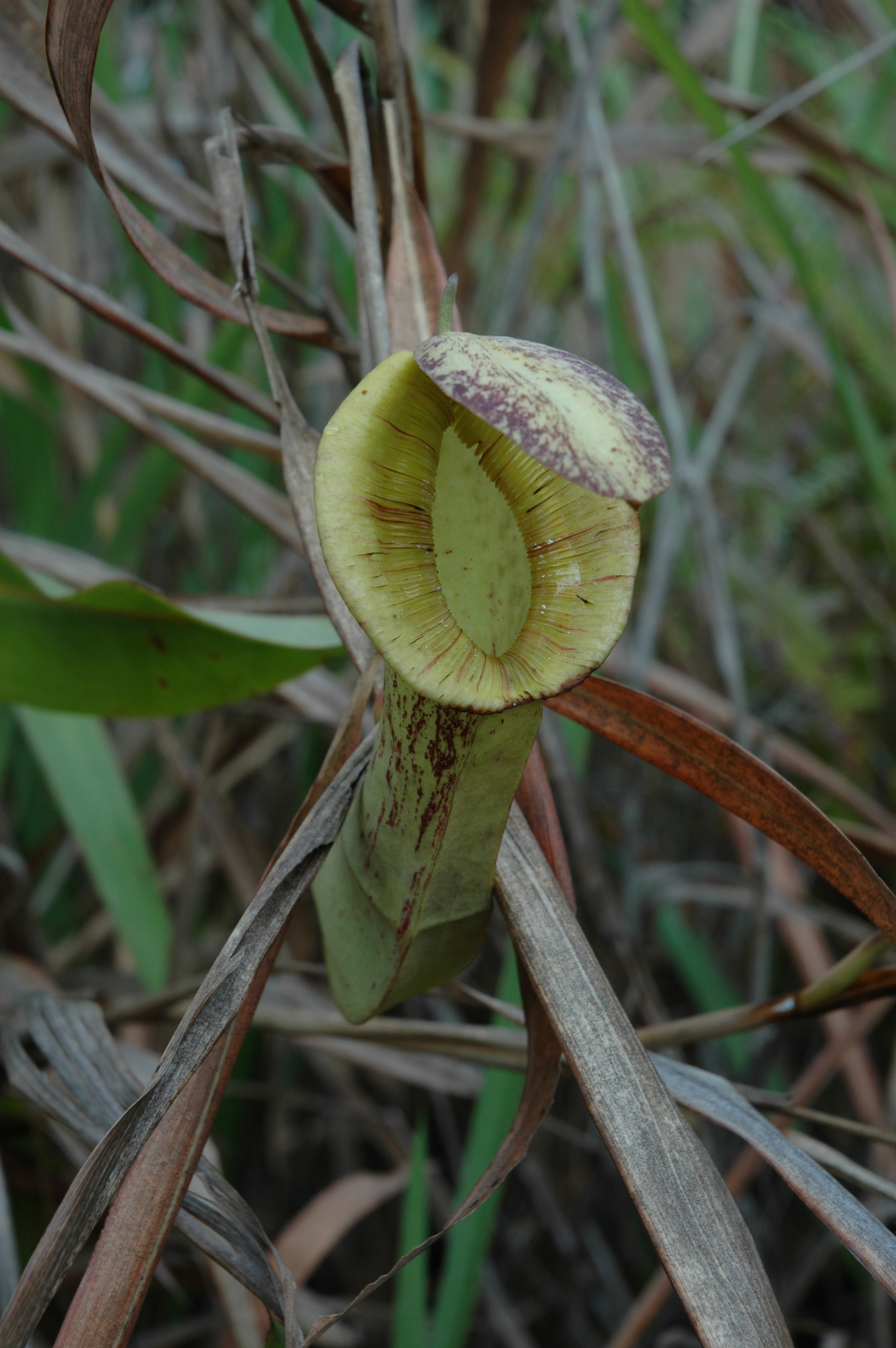
An upper pitcher of N. mirabilis var. echinostoma

Nepenthes mirabilis var. echinostoma was discovered by Odoardo Beccari in 1865 and described as a species, N. echinostoma, by Joseph Dalton Hooker in 1873. In 1882, Frederick William Burbidge described this unusual variety in The Gardeners' Chronicle as follows:

Beccari's singular N. echinostoma (vide Herb. Kew) is a wonderful thing, as yet unintroduced—indeed, I suppose unseen by any save Beccari ! The mouths of the urns remind one of the deflexed teeth of some gigantic moss of the Hypnoid section.

Nepenthes mirabilis var. echinostoma is the only form of this species that occurs in Brunei. It has also been recorded from parts of Sarawak, but appears to be completely absent from Sabah.

=== N. mirabilis var. globosa ===
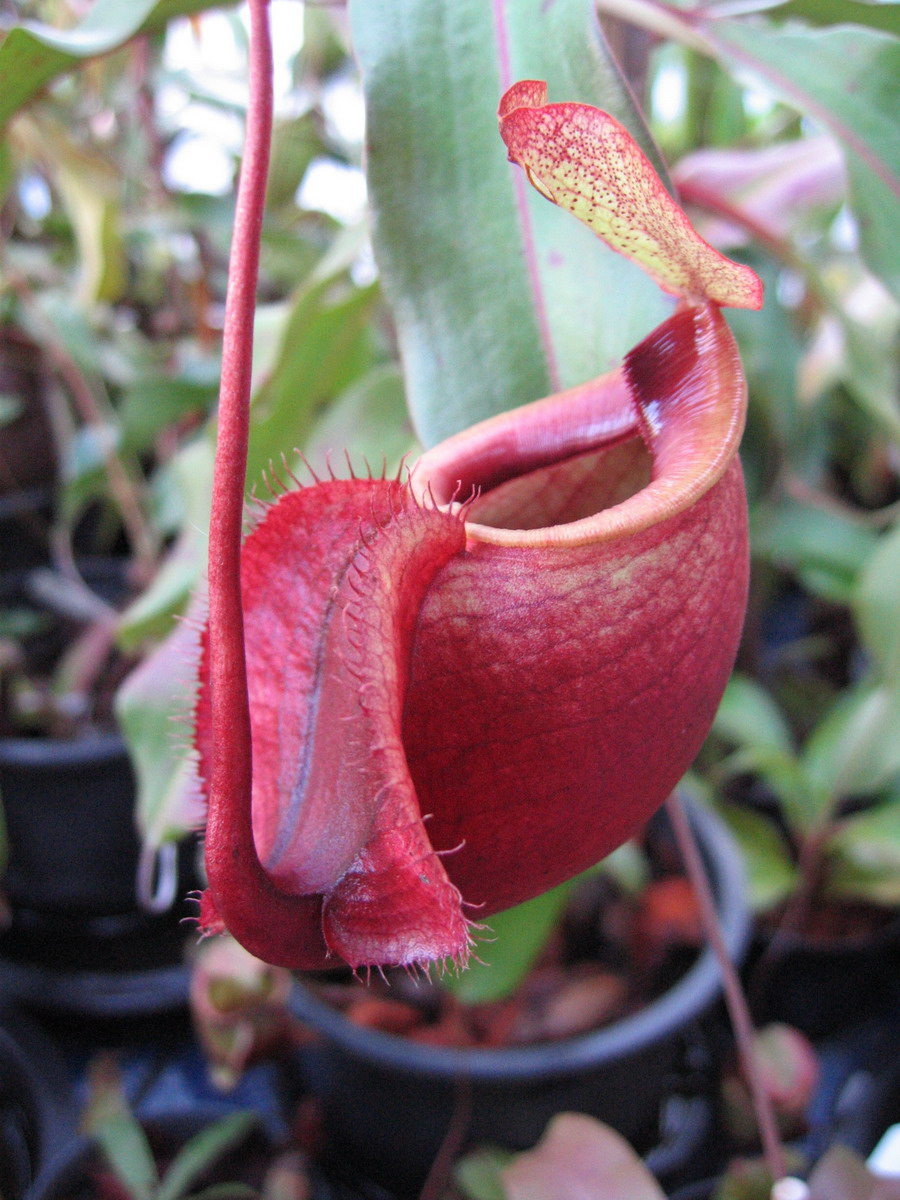
A lower pitcher of a cultivated N. mirabilis var. globosa

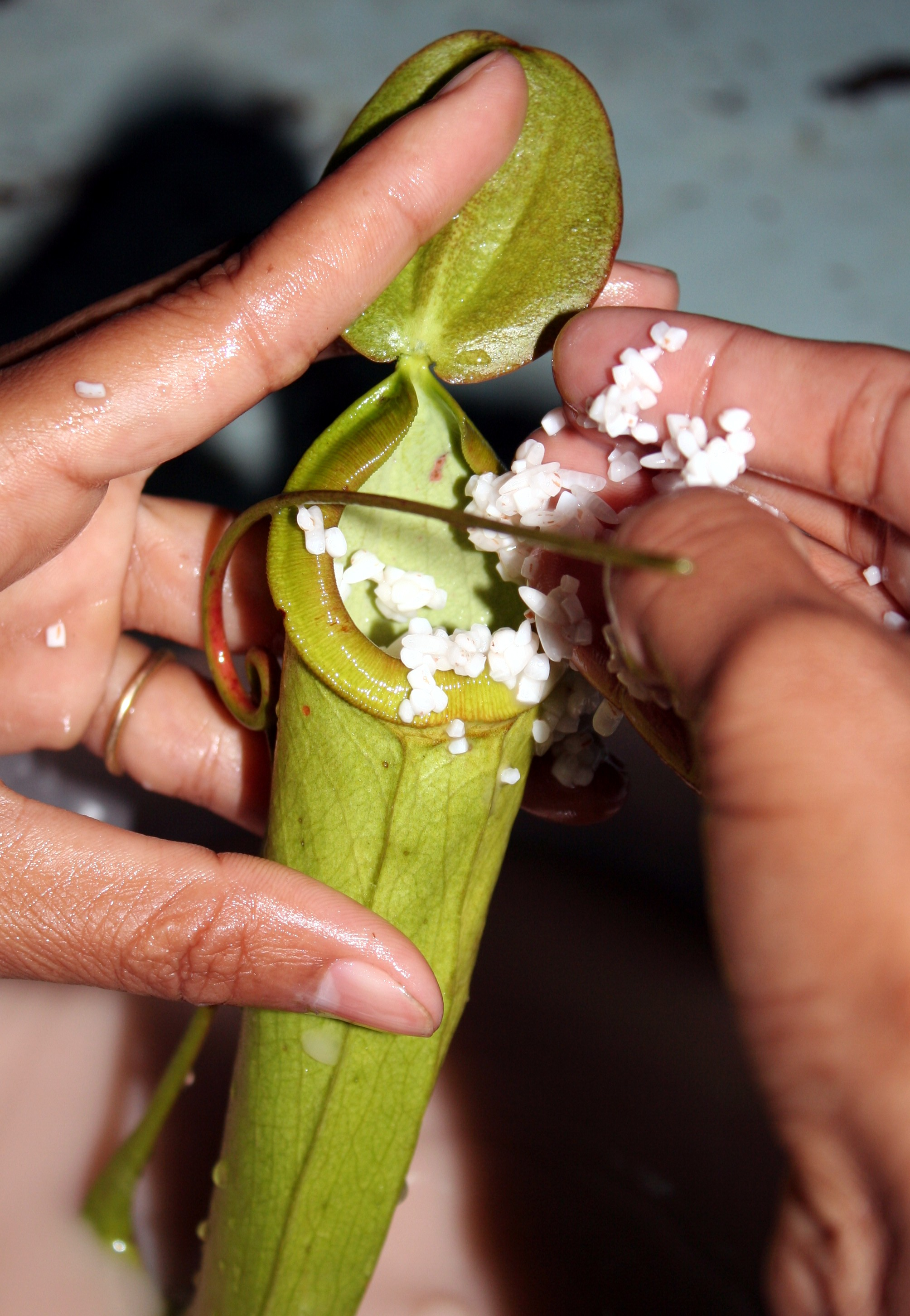
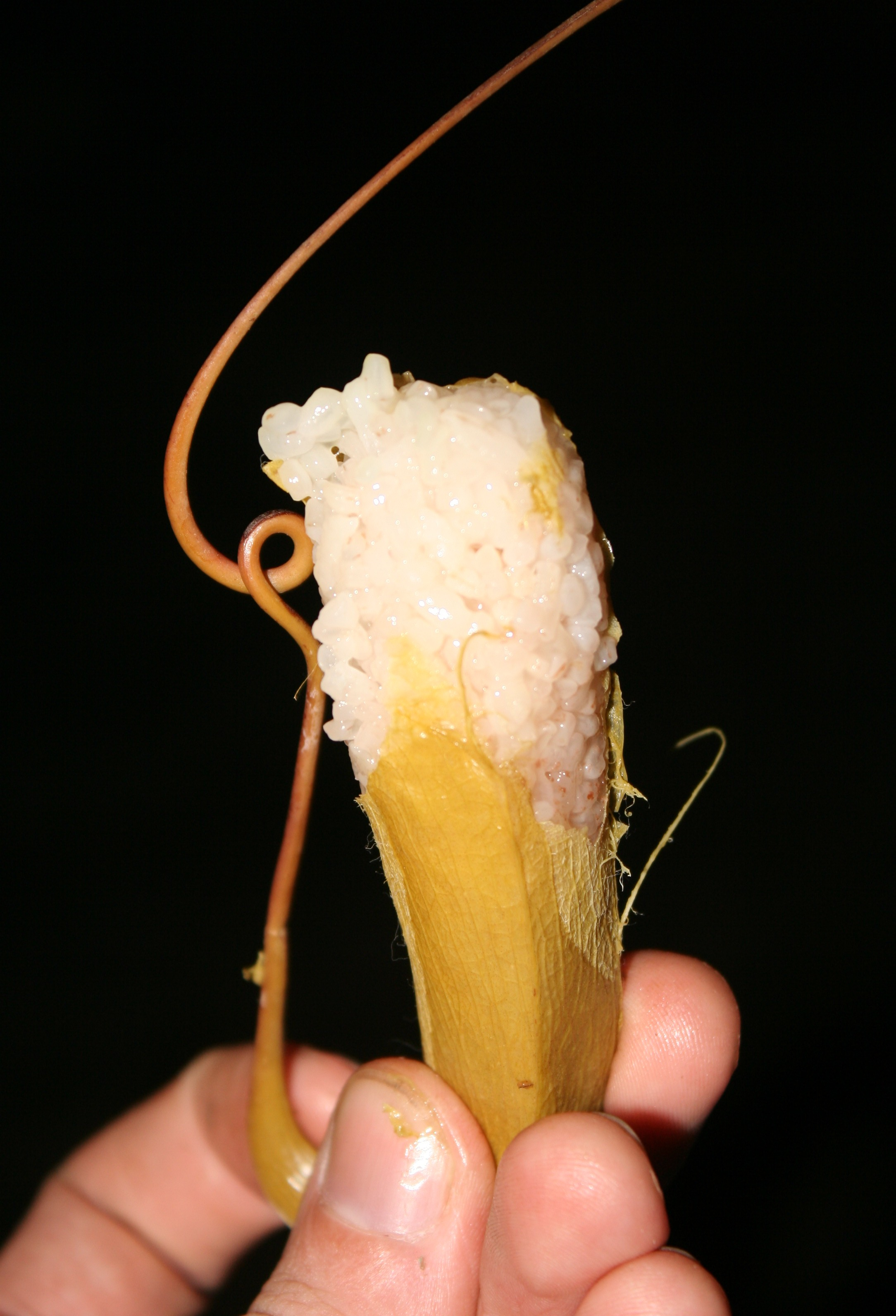
Nepenthes mirabilis pitchers being used to cook rice by the Jarai people of Kon Tum Province, Vietnam

Nepenthes mirabilis var. globosa has been recorded from a single undisclosed Andaman Sea island off Phang Nga and from the Thai mainland near the city of Trang.

This variety was featured on the cover of the January 2006 issue of the Journal of Insectivorous Plant Society, identified as "Nepenthes sp. from Thailand". The name Nepenthes globosa appeared in print in an article by Shigeo Kurata in the July 2007 issue of the Journal of the Insectivorous Plant Society. The same issue also featured an article by Masahiro Tada that referred to the plant as "Nepenthes Viking". Prior to its description by Marcello Catalano in 2010, this taxon was also published under the informal name Nepenthes sp. Phanga Nga in Stewart McPherson's 2009 book, Pitcher Plants of the Old World.

In the horticultural trade, this variety is popularly known as both Nepenthes globosa (/nɪˈpɛnθiːz ɡloʊˈboʊzə/; from Latin: globosus, "globular") and Nepenthes sp. Viking, after the resemblance the pitchers bear to the prow of a Viking ship.

== Pitcher infauna ==
A great number of infaunal organisms have been found in the pitchers of this species. These include the sarcophagid fly Sarcophaga papuensis and the mite Nepenthacarus warreni, which have both been found in Australian populations of the plant. Similarly, the mosquitoes Aedes dybasi and Aedes maehleri reside in the pitchers of N. mirabilis on the islands of Palau and Yap, respectively. Both have unusual life histories and morphological traits associated with this habit.

The nematode Baujardia mirabilis has been described from N. mirabilis in Thailand. It is not thought to be accidental; the pitchers of this species appear to be the nematode's natural habitat. The microecosystems in these pitchers were found to be dominated by mosquito larvae, midges, and B. mirabilis. It is speculated that this nematode might have a phoretic relationship with one or more infaunal insect species.

In southern China, tree frogs have been observed in the pitchers of N. mirabilis. The amphibians do not fall prey to the plant, but rather feed on insects that are caught by the pitchers. They are not affected by the acidic digestive juices (which may have a pH as low as 2), likely due to the mucilaginous outer layer of their skin.

The first record of an aquatic fungus living in the pitcher organ of a carnivorous plant came from a specimen of N. mirabilis growing along the Jardine River in Australia. The mycelial fungus was observed as both free-living in the trap's fluid and attached to chitinous insect remains.

The pitchers of N. mirabilis have also been found to harbour a complex community of bacteria. These bacterial communities appear to be more diverse than those found in the pitcher fluid of N. ampullaria and sympatric N. gracilis in Peninsular Malaysia. In N. mirabilis their composition can also differ significantly according to pitcher type, something not seen in the other two species.

== Natural hybrids ==
Nepenthes mirabilis has the greatest number of known natural hybrids of any species in the genus.

- ? (N. alata × N. merrilliana) × N. mirabilis [=N. × tsangoya]
- N. alata × N. mirabilis [=N. × mirabilata]
- N. ampullaria × N. mirabilis [=N. × kuchingensis, Nepenthes cutinensis]
- ? (N. ampullaria × N. rafflesiana) × N. mirabilis [=N. × hookeriana × N. mirabilis]
- N. andamana × N. mirabilis (including N. andamana × N. mirabilis var. globosa)
- N. benstonei × N. mirabilis
- N. bicalcarata × N. mirabilis (including N. bicalcarata × N. mirabilis var. echinostoma)
- ? (N. bicalcarata × N. rafflesiana) × N. mirabilis var. echinostoma
- N. gracilis × N. mirabilis [=N. × sharifah-hapsahii, N. × ghazallyana, N. × grabilis, N. neglecta?]
- N. insignis × N. mirabilis
- N. kampotiana × N. mirabilis
- N. kongkandana × N. mirabilis
- N. merrilliana × N. mirabilis
- N. mirabilis × N. northiana
- N. mirabilis × N. rafflesiana (including N. mirabilis var. echinostoma × N. rafflesiana)
- N. mirabilis × N. reinwardtiana
- N. mirabilis × N. rowaniae
- N. mirabilis × N. smilesii
- N. mirabilis × N. spathulata
- N. mirabilis × N. sumatrana
- N. mirabilis × N. tenax
- N. mirabilis × N. thorelii
- N. mirabilis × N. tomoriana
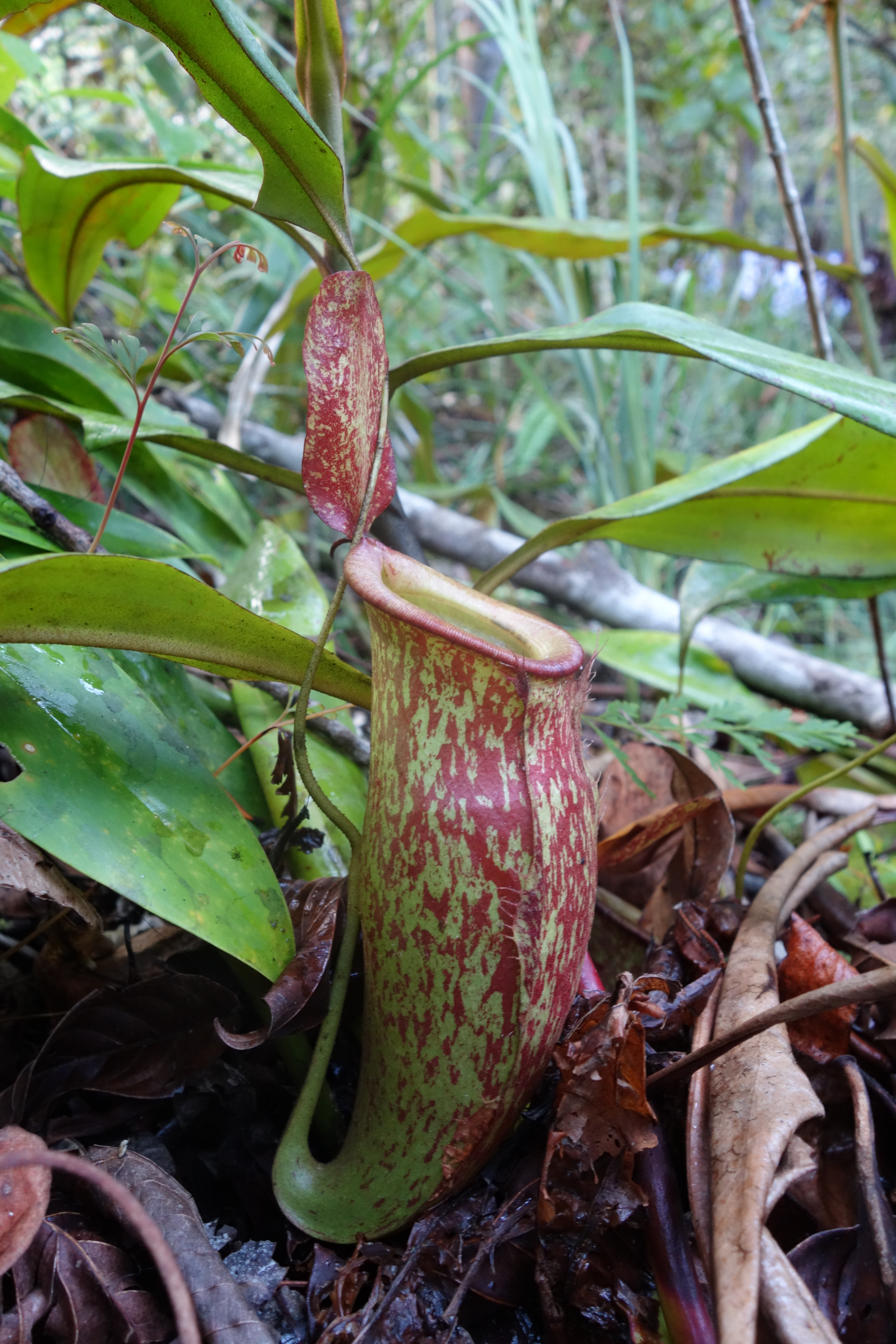
N. ampullaria × N. mirabilis

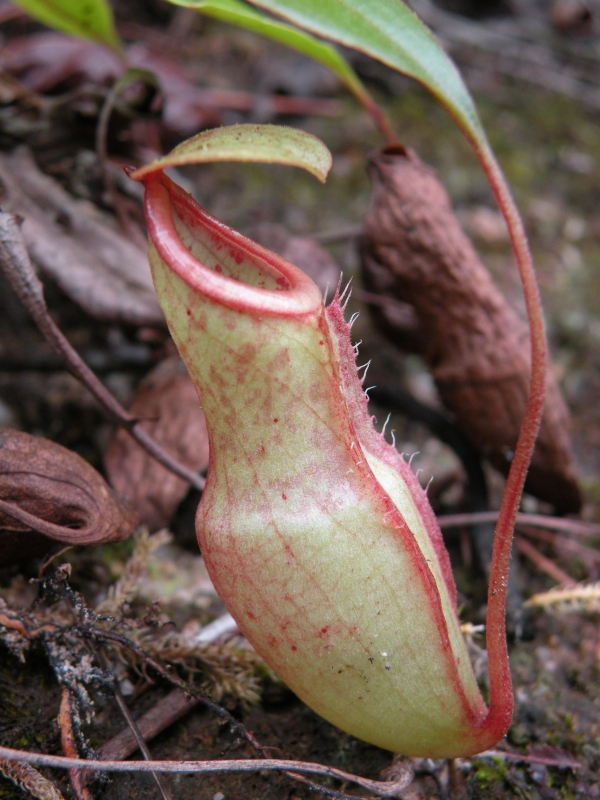
N. benstonei × N. mirabilis

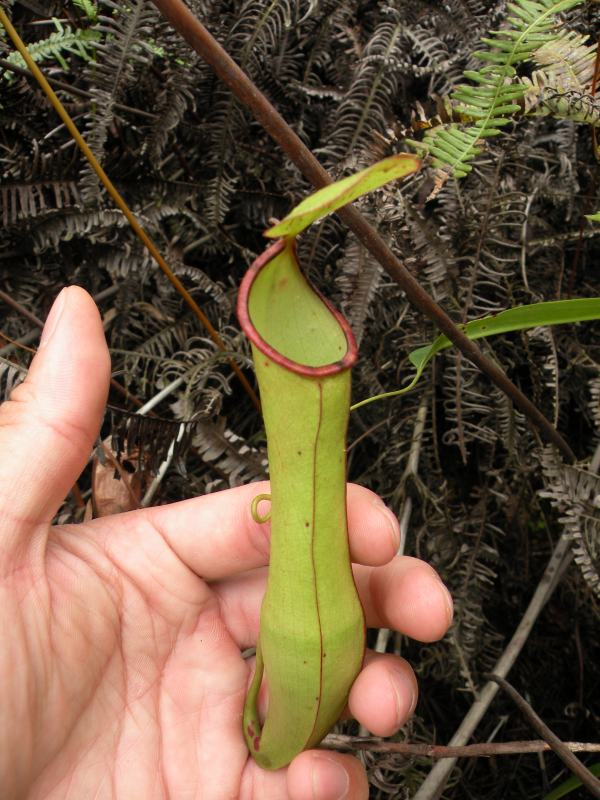
N. gracilis × N. mirabilis

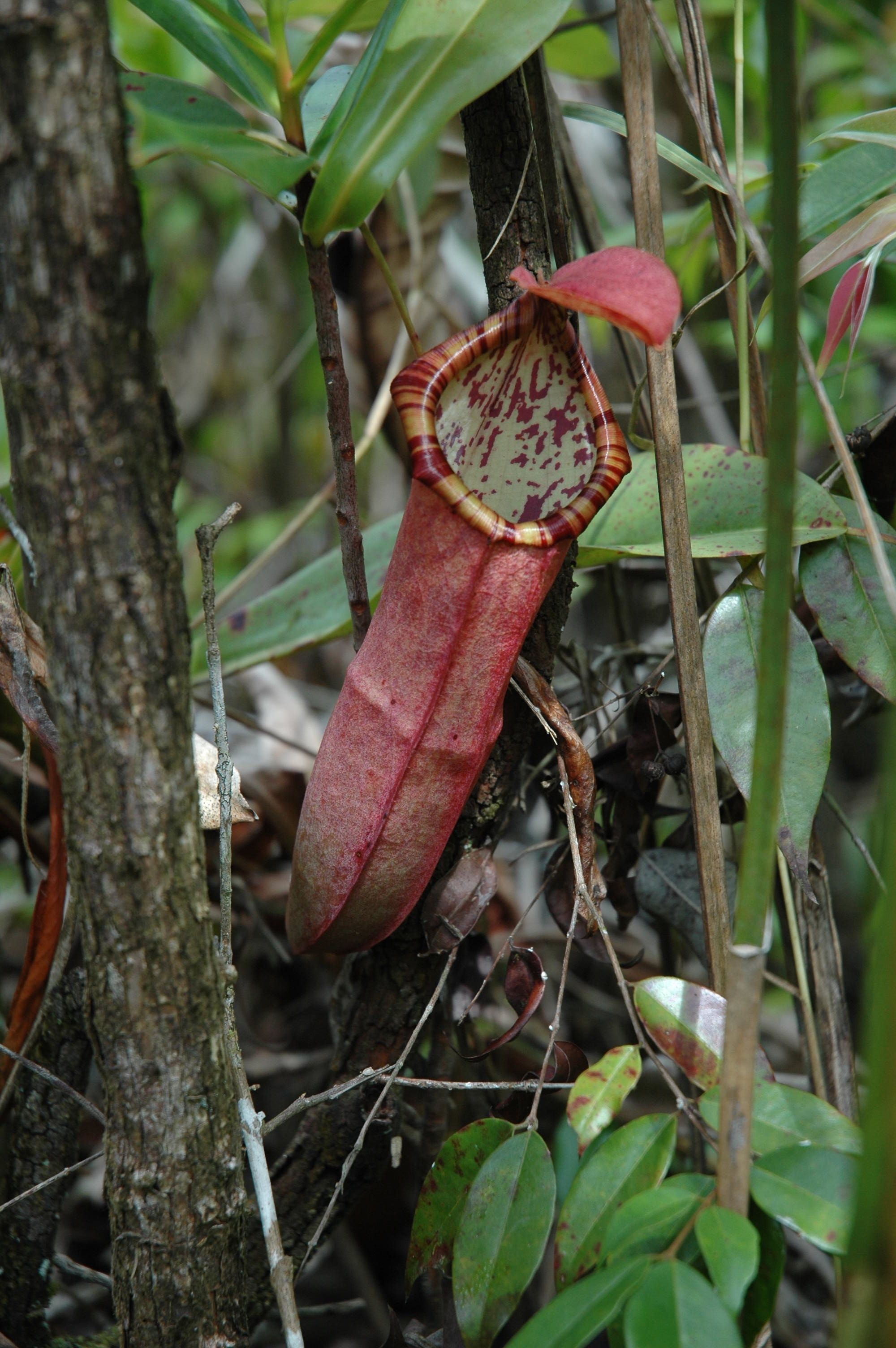
N. mirabilis × N. northiana

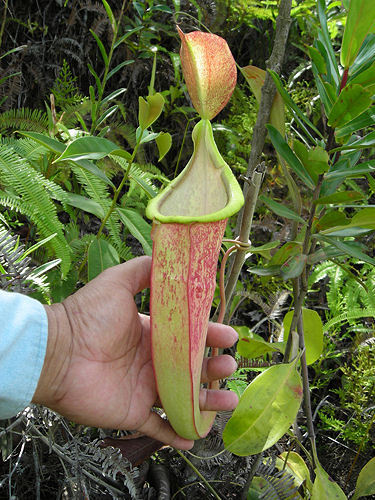
N. mirabilis × N. rafflesiana

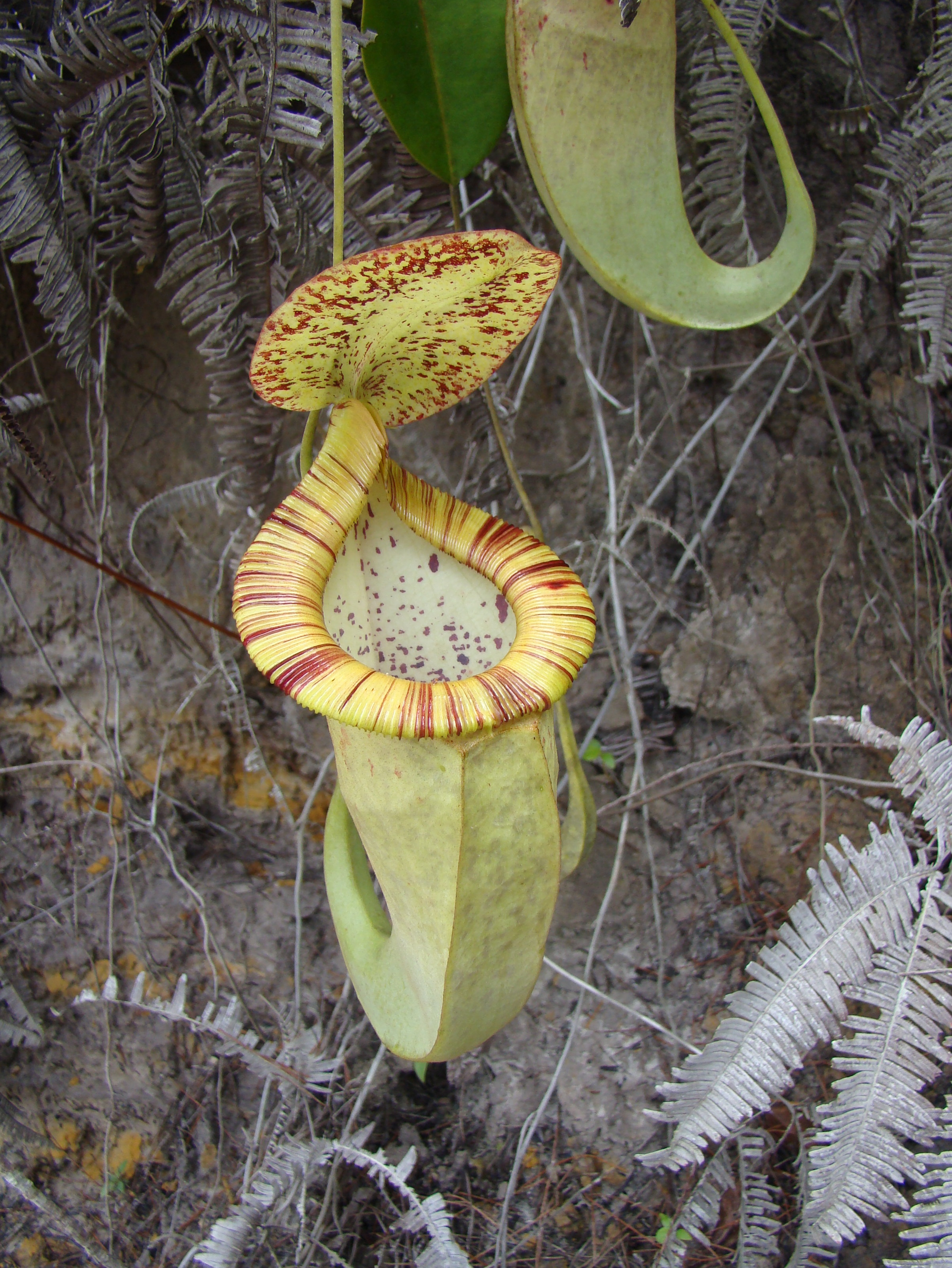
N. mirabilis var. echinostoma × N. rafflesiana

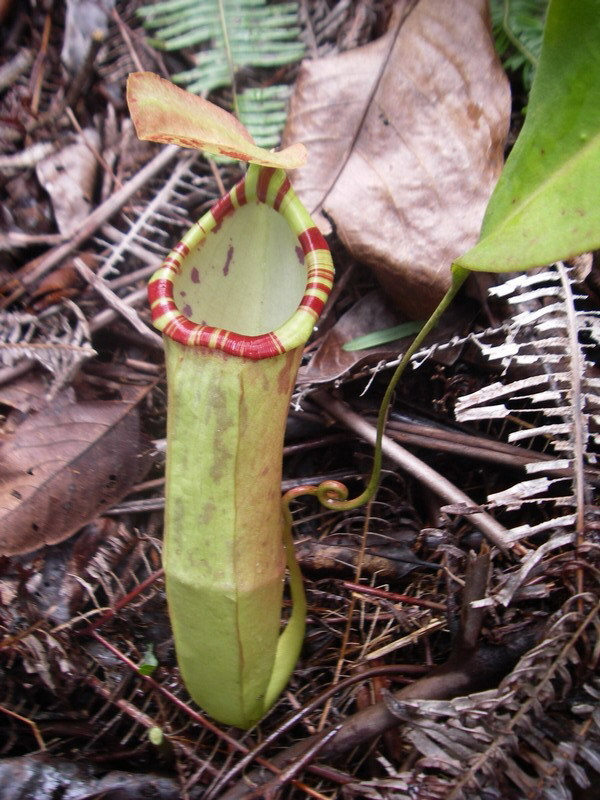
N. mirabilis × N. sumatrana

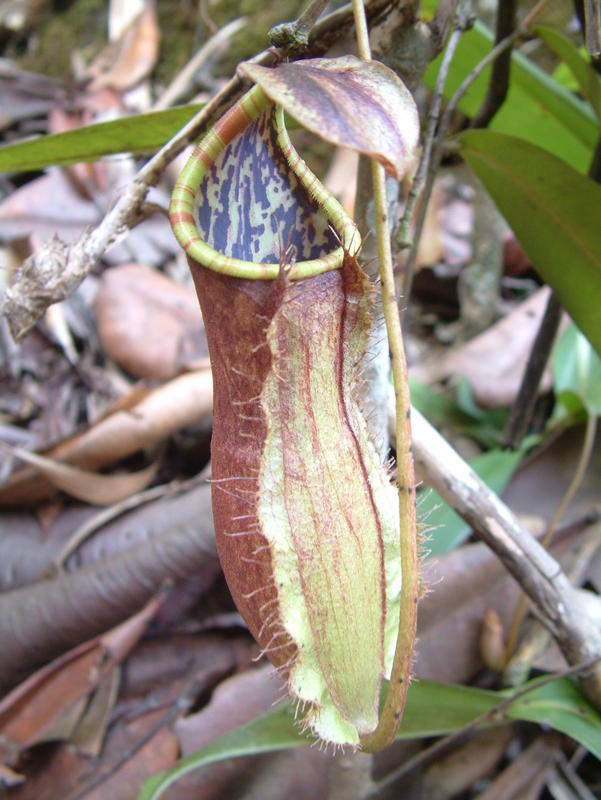
? N. mirabilis × N. tomoriana
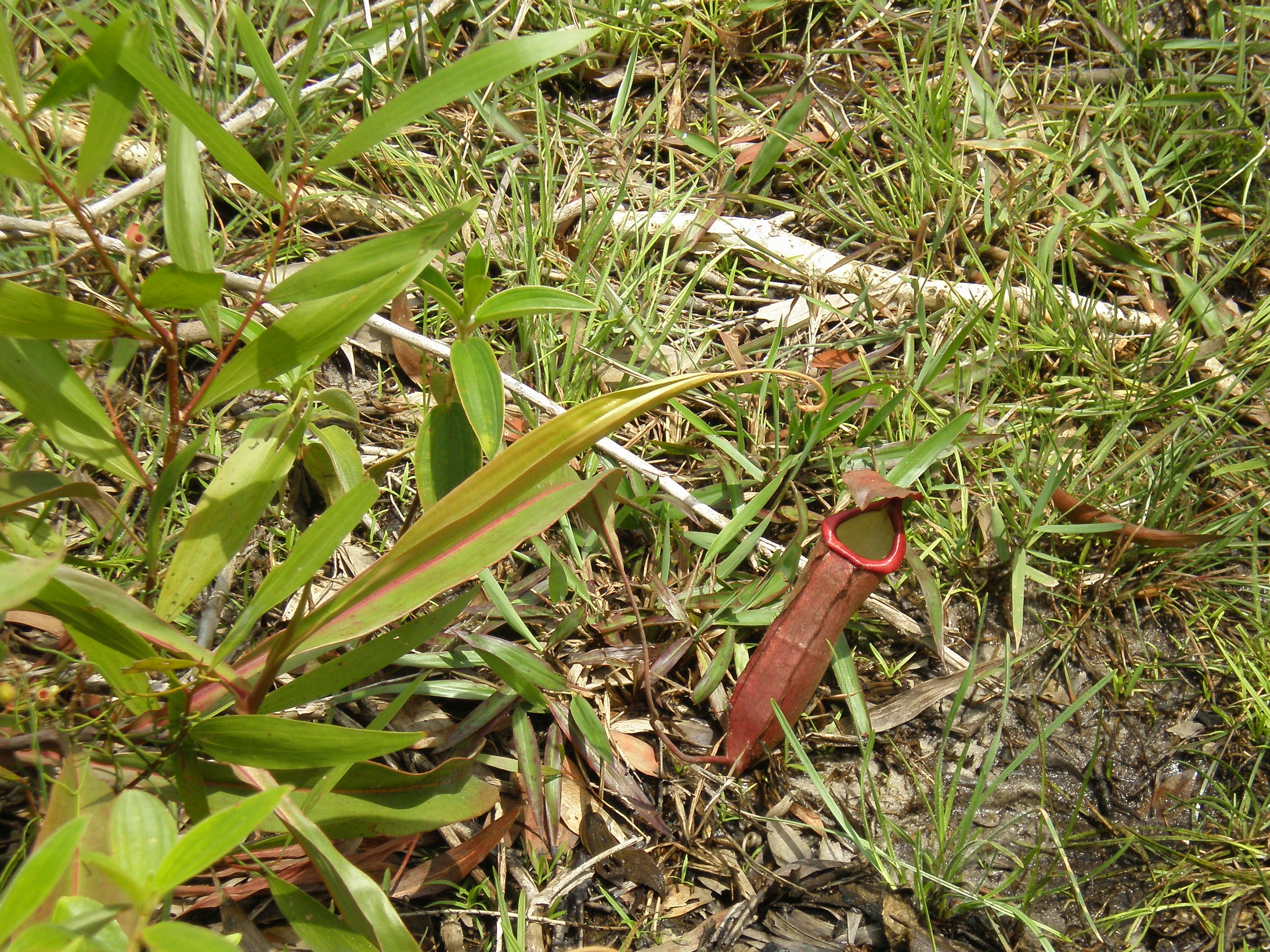
? N. mirabilis × N. thorelii

== Notes ==
a. Nepenthes mirabilis was first described under the Linnaean taxonomic system as Phyllamphora mirabilis by João de Loureiro in 1790. It was then transferred to the genus Nepenthes under the incorrect combination Nepenthes phyllamphora by Carl Ludwig Willdenow in 1805. Most sources attribute the earliest publication of the correct binomial—Nepenthes mirabilis—to George Claridge Druce in 1916, despite Jan Schlauer's Carnivorous Plant Database recording a much earlier publication by Rafarin in 1869. Per Article 36.1 of the International Code of Nomenclature for algae, fungi and plants, the publication of the name by Rafarin is not valid because Rafarin specifically indicates that N. mirabilis is a synonym of Phyllamphora mirabilis.
