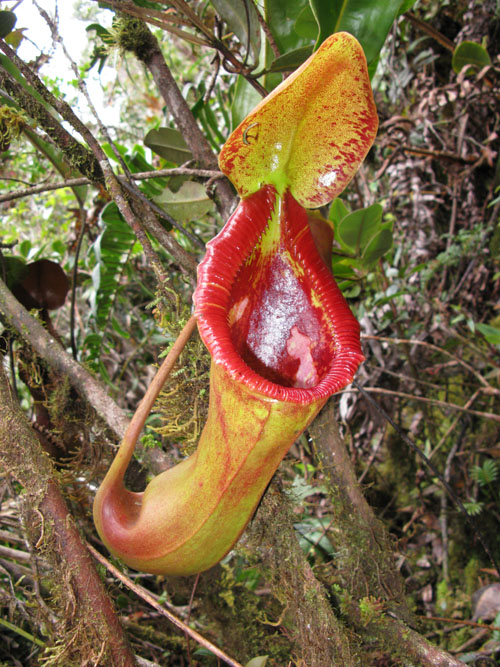
- Nepenthes × trusmadiensis
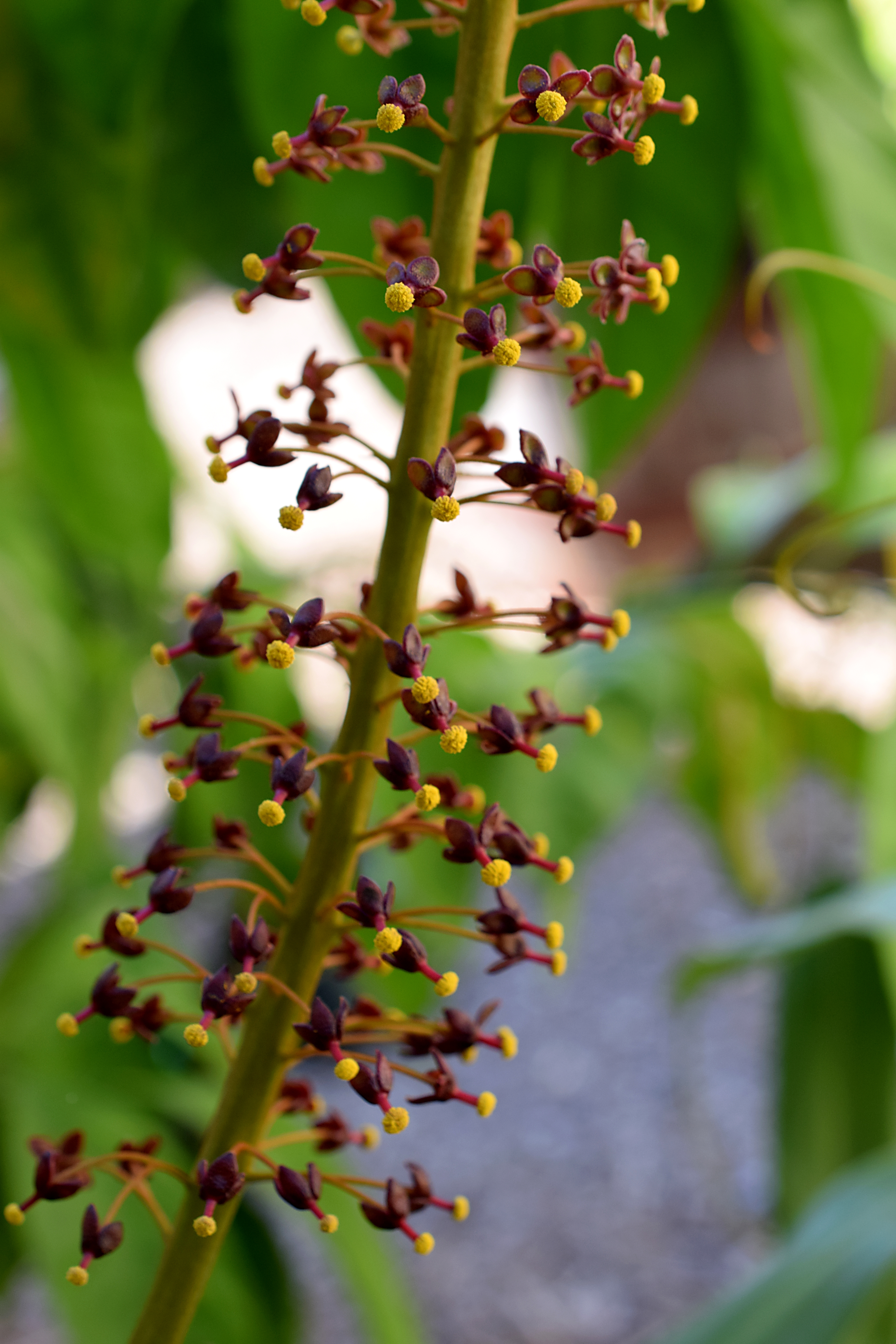
- Flowers of Nepenthes 'Miranda'

Scientific classification
- Kingdom: Plantae
- Clade: Embryophytes
- Clade: Tracheophytes
- Clade: Spermatophytes
- Clade: Angiosperms
- Clade: Eudicots
- Order: Caryophyllales
- Family: Nepenthaceae; Dumort.
- Genus: Nepenthes; L.

Type species
- Nepenthes distillatoria L.

Species
- See below or separate list.

Diversity
- 150+ species

Synonyms
- Anurosperma Hallier f.; Bandura Adans.; Phyllamphora Lour.

= Nepenthes =

Tropical pitcher plants

Nepenthes (/nɪˈpɛnθiːz/ nih-PEN-theez) is a genus of carnivorous plants, also known as tropical pitcher plants, or monkey cups, in the monotypic family Nepenthaceae. The genus includes about 170 species, and numerous natural and many cultivated hybrids. They are mostly liana-forming plants of the Old World tropics, ranging from South China, Indonesia, Malaysia, and the Philippines; westward to Madagascar (two species) and the Seychelles (one); southward to Australia (four) and New Caledonia (one); and northward to India (one) and Sri Lanka (one). The greatest diversity occurs on Borneo, Sumatra, and the Philippines, with many endemic species. Many are plants of hot, humid, lowland areas, but most are tropical, montane plants, receiving warm days but cool to cold, humid nights year-round. A few are considered tropical alpine, with cool days and nights near freezing. The name "monkey cups" refers to the fact that monkeys were once thought to drink rainwater from the pitchers.

== Description ==
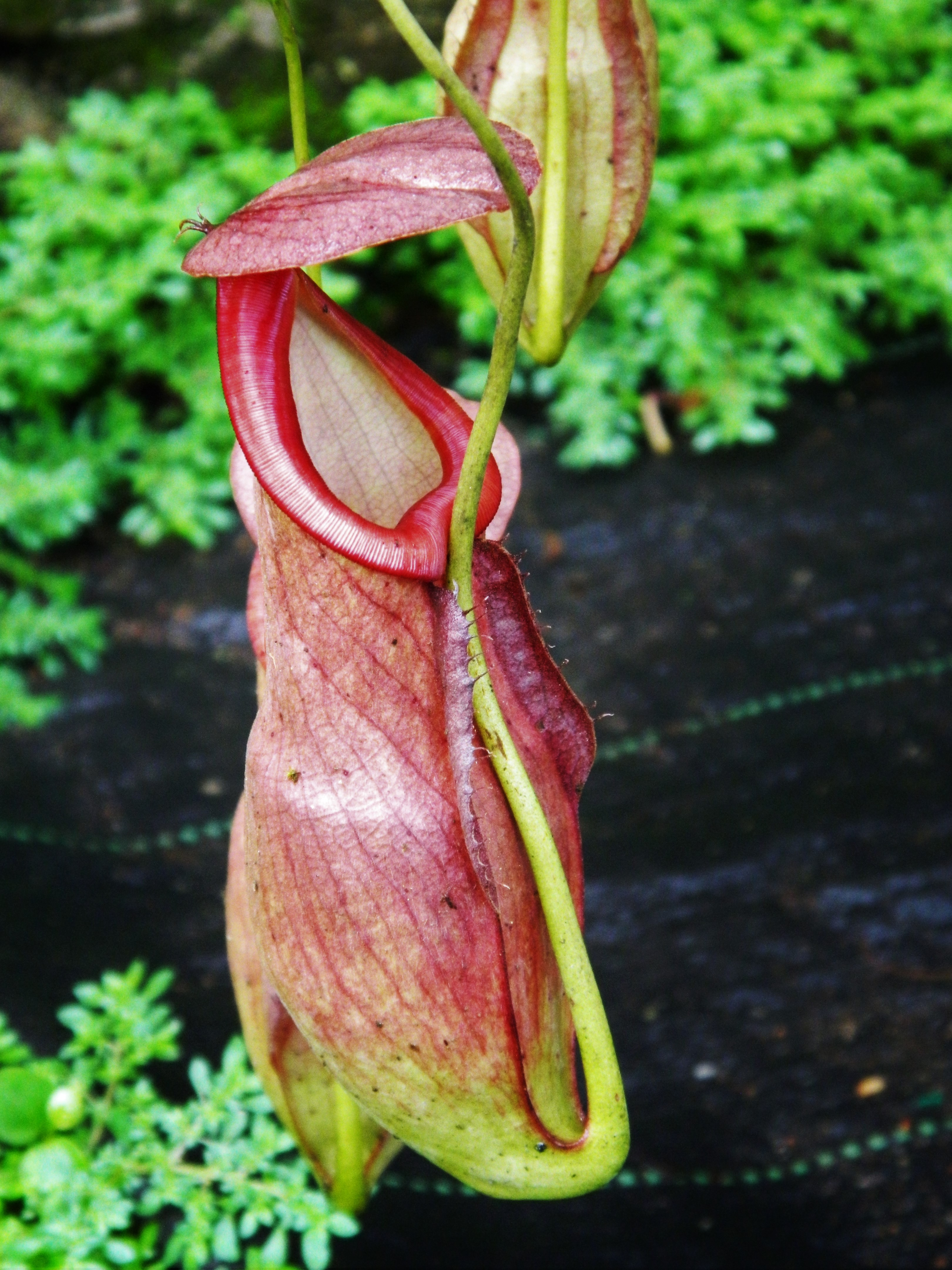
Nepenthes mirabilis at the Periyar Tiger Reserve, in Southern Western Ghats of India

Nepenthes species usually consist of a shallow root system and a prostrate or climbing stem, often several metres long and up to 15 m (49 ft) or more, and usually 1 cm (0.4 in) or less in diameter, although this may be thicker in a few species (e.g. N. bicalcarata). From the stems arise alternate, sword-shaped leaves with entire leaf margins. An extension of the midrib (the tendril), which in some species aids in climbing, protrudes from the tip of the leaf; at the end of the tendril the pitcher forms. The pitcher starts as a small bud and gradually expands into a globe- or tube-shaped trap.

Basic structure of an upper pitcher

The trap contains a fluid secreted by the plant, which may be watery or more viscous, and is used to drown the prey. This fluid contains viscoelastic biopolymers that may be crucial to the retention of insects within the traps of many species. The viscoelastic fluid in the pitchers is effective in the retention of winged insects. The trapping efficiency of this fluid remains high, even when significantly diluted by water, as inevitably happens in wet conditions.

The lower part of the trap contains glands that absorb nutrients from captured prey. Along the upper inside part of the trap is a slick, waxy coating, which makes the escape of its prey nearly impossible. Surrounding the entrance to the trap is a structure called the peristome (the "lip"), which is slippery and often quite colourful, attracting prey, but offering an unsure footing. The prey-capture effectiveness of the peristome is further enhanced in moist environments, where condensation may cause a thin water film to form on the surface of the peristome. When wet, the slippery surface of the peristome causes insects to "aquaplane", or slip and fall, into the pitcher. Above the peristome is a lid (the operculum); in many species, this keeps rain from diluting the fluid within the pitcher, the underside of which may contain nectar glands that attract prey.

Nepenthes species usually produce two types of pitchers, known as leaf dimorphism. Appearing near the base of the plant are the large, lower traps, which typically sit on the ground. The upper or aerial pitchers are usually smaller, coloured differently, and possess different features from the lower pitchers. These upper pitchers usually form as the plant reaches maturity and the plant grows taller. To keep the plant steady, the upper pitchers often form a loop in the tendril, allowing it to wrap around nearby support. In some species (e.g. N. rafflesiana), different prey may be attracted by the two types of pitchers. This varied morphology also often makes identification of species difficult.

Prey usually consists of insects, but the largest species (e.g. N. rajah and N. rafflesiana) may occasionally catch small vertebrates, such as "frogs, birds, and small mammals". Records of cultivated plants trapping small birds have been made. Flowers occur in racemes or more rarely in panicles with male and female flowers on separate plants. Three species have symbiotic relationships with treeshrews, which eat the nectar produced by the plant and defecate into the pitchers, providing valuable nutrients.

Nepenthes are insect-pollinated, the primary agents being flies (including blow flies, midges, and mosquitoes), moths, wasps, and butterflies. Their smells can range from sweet to musty or fungus-like. Seed is typically produced in a four-sided capsule which may contain 50–500 wind-distributed seeds, consisting of a central embryo and two wings, one on either side (though N. pervillei differs).

The genus is cytologically diploid, with all studied species having a chromosome number of 2n=80. This high number is thought to reflect paleopolyploidy (likely 8x or 16x).

== Taxonomy ==
About 170 species of Nepenthes are currently recognised as valid. This number is increasing, with several new species being described each year.

=== Etymology ===
The genus name Nepenthes was first published in 1737 in Carl Linnaeus's Hortus Cliffortianus. It references a passage in Homer's Odyssey, in which the potion "Nepenthes pharmakon" is given to Helen by an Egyptian queen. "Nepenthes" (Ancient Greek: νηπενθές) literally means "without grief" (νη nē = "not", πένθος penthos = "grief") and, in Greek mythology, is a drug that quells all sorrows with forgetfulness. Linnaeus explained:

If this is not Helen's Nepenthes, it certainly will be for all botanists. What botanist would not be filled with admiration if, after a long journey, he should find this wonderful plant. In his astonishment, past ills would be forgotten when beholding this admirable work of the Creator! [translated from Latin by Harry Veitch]

The plant Linnaeus described was N. distillatoria, called bāndurā (බාඳුරා), a species from Sri Lanka.

Nepenthes was formally published as a generic name in 1753 in Linnaeus's famous Species Plantarum, which established botanical nomenclature as it exists today. Nepenthes distillatoria is the type species of the genus.

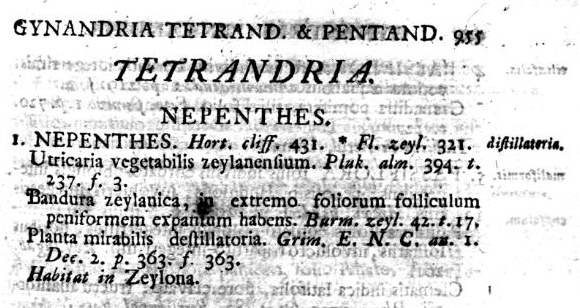
Nepenthes from Carolus Linnaeus's Species Plantarum of 1753

The name "monkey cups" was discussed in the May 1964 issue of National Geographic, in which Paul A. Zahl wrote:

The carriers called them "monkey cups", a name I had heard elsewhere in reference to Nepenthes, but the implication that monkeys drink the pitcher fluid seemed farfetched. I later proved it true. In Sarawak, I found an orangutan that had been raised as a pet and later freed. As I approached it gingerly in the forest, I offered it a half-full pitcher. To my surprise, the ape accepted it, and with the finesse of a lady at tea, executed a delicate bottoms-up.

The plants are often called kantong semar (Semar's pocket) in Indonesia and sako ni Hudas (Judas' money bag) in the Philippines.

=== Evolution and phylogeny ===
An absence of evidence of intermediate species, fossil or living (i.e. a missing link), does not allow forming a phylogenetic timeline for the development of the distinctive traits of modern Nepenthes, which include its relatively rare strict dioecy and carnivorous pitchers. Although Nepenthes is distantly related to several modern genera, among these, even the carnivorous relatives [the sundews (Drosera), Venus flytrap (Dionaea muscipula), waterwheel plant (Aldrovanda), and dewy pine (Drosophyllum)], all lack those traits. Among known Nepenthes, no protomodern characteristics or large variations are found, which suggests that all extant species radiated from a single close ancestor bearing all the modern traits. Phylogenetic comparisons of the chloroplast matK gene sequences between Nepenthes species and with related species support this conclusion, long genetic distance between Nepenthes and others, and abruptly diverging "pom-pon" grouping of the Nepenthes species .

Fossilized pollen of Nepenthes-like plants living on the northern Tethys Sea from 65 to 35 million years ago indicates that then-warmer Europe may have been where the proto-Nepenthes developed, and then escaped to Asia and India as Africa collided with Europe and the ensuing climate change wiped out the ancestral species in the original habitat. About 20 million years ago, Borneo, Sumatra, and Sulawesi and possibly even the Philippines were connected to mainland Asia, providing a bridge for the colonization of most sites of Nepenthes species radiation. The extensive land bridges in the area 20,000 years ago during the ice age would have provided access to the remaining sites of Nepenthes populations in Oceania. The main complication with this hypothesis is the presence of Nepenthes on the distant islands of Seychelles and Madagascar. The seeds were thought to have been transferred by seabirds and shorebirds, which rest during their migrations in swampy habitats and may have inadvertently picked up the seeds. This hypothesis is possibly reinforced by the success of the lowland swamp-dwelling N. distillatoria in colonizing so many locations.

== Distribution and habitat ==
Global distribution of Nepenthes

The genus Nepenthes is mostly found within the Malay Archipelago, with the greatest biodiversity found on Borneo, Sumatra, and the Philippines, especially in the Borneo montane rain forests. The full range of the genus includes Madagascar (N. madagascariensis and N. masoalensis), the Seychelles (N. pervillei), Sri Lanka (N. distillatoria), and India (N. khasiana) in the west to Australia (N. mirabilis, N. rowanae, N. parvula, and N. tenax) and New Caledonia (N. vieillardii) in the southeast. Most species are restricted to very small ranges, including some found only on individual mountains. These limited distributions and the inaccessibility of the regions often means some species go decades without being rediscovered in the wild (e.g. N. deaniana, which was rediscovered 100 years after its initial discovery). About 10 species have population distributions larger than a single island or group of smaller islands. Nepenthes mirabilis has the distinction of being the most widely distributed species in the genus, ranging from Indochina and throughout the Malay Archipelago to Australia.

Because of the nature of the habitats that Nepenthes species occupy, they are often graded as either lowland or highland species, depending on their altitude above sea level, with 1,200 m (3,937 ft) the rough delineation between lowland and highland. Species growing at lower altitudes require continuously warm climates with little difference between day and night temperatures, whereas highland species thrive when they receive warm days and much cooler nights. Nepenthes lamii grows at a higher altitude than any other in the genus, up to 3,520 m (11,549 ft).

Most Nepenthes species grow in environments that provide high humidity and precipitation and moderate to high light levels. A few species, including N. ampullaria, prefer the dense, shaded forests, but most other species thrive on the margins of tree/shrub communities or clearings. Some species (e.g. N. mirabilis) have been found growing in clear-cut forest areas, roadsides, and disturbed fields. Other species have adapted to growing in savanna-like grass communities. The soils in which Nepenthes species grow are usually acidic and low in nutrients, being composed of peat, white sand, sandstone, or volcanic soils. Exceptions to these generalities include species that thrive in soils with high heavy metal content (e.g. N. rajah), on sandy beaches in the sea spray zone (e.g. N. albomarginata). Other species grow on inselbergs and as lithophytes, while others, such as N. inermis, can grow as epiphytes with no soil contact.

== Ecological relationships ==
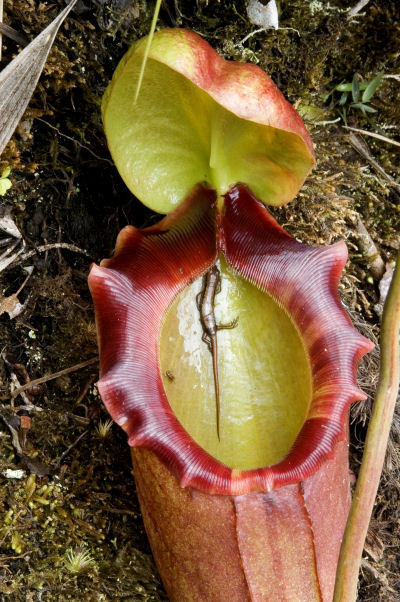
A drowned lizard found in a freshly opened pitcher of N. rajah

The most obvious interaction between Nepenthes species and their environments, including other organisms, is that of predator and prey. Nepenthes species attract their prey through active production of attractive colours, sugary nectar, and sweet scents. From this relationship, the plants primarily gain nitrogen and phosphorus to supplement their nutrient requirements for growth, given these soil nutrients are typically lacking. The most frequent prey is an abundant and diverse group of arthropods, with ants and other insects topping the menu. Other arthropods found frequently include spiders, scorpions, and centipedes, while snails and frogs are more unusual, but not unheard of. The most uncommon prey for Nepenthes species includes rats found in N. rajah. The composition of prey captured depends on many factors, including location, but can incorporate hundreds of individual insects and many different species. While many Nepenthes species are generalists in what they capture, at least one, N. albomarginata, has specialised and almost exclusively traps termites and produces nearly no nectar. Nepenthes albomarginata gains its name from the ring of white trichomes directly beneath the peristome. These trichomes—or "hairs"—are palatable to termites and will attract them to the pitcher. In the course of collecting the edible trichomes, hundreds or thousands of termites will fall into the pitcher.

Prey retention by viscoelastic pitcher fluid of N. rafflesiana
The blue bottle fly (Calliphora vomitoria) can escape after landing in water on its ventral surface.

The same is true if the fly falls in dorsally (wings-first).

But the viscoelastic properties of N. rafflesiana digestive fluid prevent prey escape, whether the fall is ventral..

..or dorsal. (All videos recorded at 500 frames/s)

=== Symbioses ===
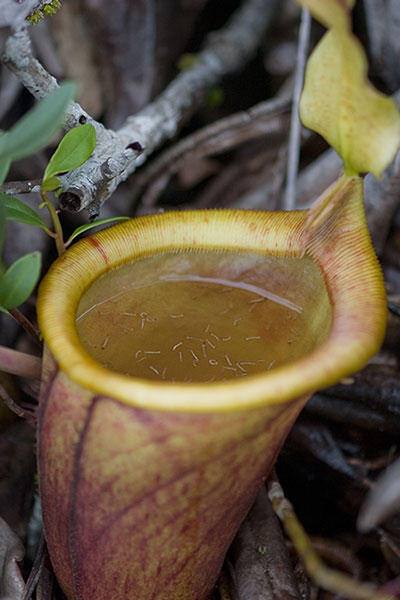
A lower pitcher of N. attenboroughii supporting a large population of mosquito larvae. The upright lid of this species exposes its pitchers to the elements such that they are often completely filled with fluid.

N. bicalcarata provides space in the hollow tendrils of its upper pitchers for the carpenter ant Camponotus schmitzi to build nests. The ants take larger prey from the pitchers, which may benefit N. bicalcarata by reducing the amount of putrefaction of collected organic matter that could harm the natural community of infaunal species that aid the plant's digestion.

N. lowii has also formed a dependent relationship, but with vertebrates instead of insects. The pitchers of N. lowii provide a sugary exudate reward on the reflexed pitcher lid (operculum) and a perch for tree shrew species, which have been found eating the exudate and defecating into the pitcher. A 2009 study, which coined the term "tree shrew lavatories", determined between 57 and 100% of the plant's foliar nitrogen uptake comes from the faeces of tree shrews. Another study showed the shape and size of the pitcher orifice of N. lowii exactly match the dimensions of a typical tree shrew (Tupaia montana). A similar adaptation was found in N. macrophylla, N. rajah, N. ampullaria, and is also likely to be present in N. ephippiata.

Similarly, N. hemsleyana, which is native to Borneo, has a symbiotic partnership with Hardwicke's woolly bat. During the day, a bat may roost above the digestive fluid inside the pitcher. While a bat is inside, it may defaecate, with the plant gaining nitrogen from the droppings. Further research has discovered that the shape and design of the pitcher has evolved to be an acoustic reflector to make it easier for bats to echo-locate, and distinguishes it from other closely related species that don't make good roosts.

=== Infauna ===
Organisms that spend at least part of their lives within the pitchers of Nepenthes species are often called Nepenthes infauna. The most common infaunal species, often representing the top trophic level of the infaunal ecosystem, are many species of mosquito larvae. Other infaunal species include fly and midge larvae, spiders, mites, ants, and even a species of crab (Geosesarma malayanum). Many of these species specialise to one pitcher plant species and are found nowhere else. These specialists are called nepenthebionts. Others, often associated with but not dependent on Nepenthes species, are called nepenthophiles. Nepenthexenes, on the other hand, are rarely found in the pitchers, but will often appear when putrefaction approaches a certain threshold, attracting fly larvae that would normally not be found in the pitcher infaunal community. The complex ecological relationship between pitcher plants and infauna is not yet fully understood, but the relationship may be mutualistic: the infauna is given shelter, food, or protection, and the plant that harbours the infauna receives expedited breakdown of captured prey, increasing the rate of digestion and keeping harmful bacterial populations repressed.

=== Antimicrobial properties ===
Nepenthes digestive fluids are sterile before pitchers open and contain secondary metabolites and proteins that act as bactericides and fungicides after the pitcher opens. While the digestive fluid is being produced, the pitcher is not yet open, so there is no chance of microbial contamination. During pitcher development, at least 29 digestive proteins including proteases, chitinases, pathogenesis-related proteins and thaumatin-like proteins are produced in the pitcher fluid. In addition to breaking down prey, these can act as antimicrobial agents. When the pitchers open, the fluid is exposed to bacteria, fungal spores, insects and rain. Often pitchers have a lid that covers the trap, excepting a few (e.g. N. lowii, N. attenboroughii and N. jamban), preventing rain water from entering. The lid inhibits rainwater from diluting the digestive fluid. Once the bacteria and fungi enter the fluid, secondary metabolites are produced in addition to antimicrobial proteins. Naphthoquinones, a class of secondary metabolite, are commonly produced, and these either kill or inhibit the growth and reproduction of bacteria and fungi. This adaptation could have evolved since Nepenthes plants that could produce secondary metabolites and antimicrobial proteins to kill bacteria and fungi were most likely more fit. Plants that produced antimicrobial compounds could prevent loss of valuable nutrients gained from insects within the pitcher. Since Nepenthes cannot digest certain bacteria and fungi, the bactericides and fungicides allow plants to maximize nutrient uptake.

== Botanical history ==
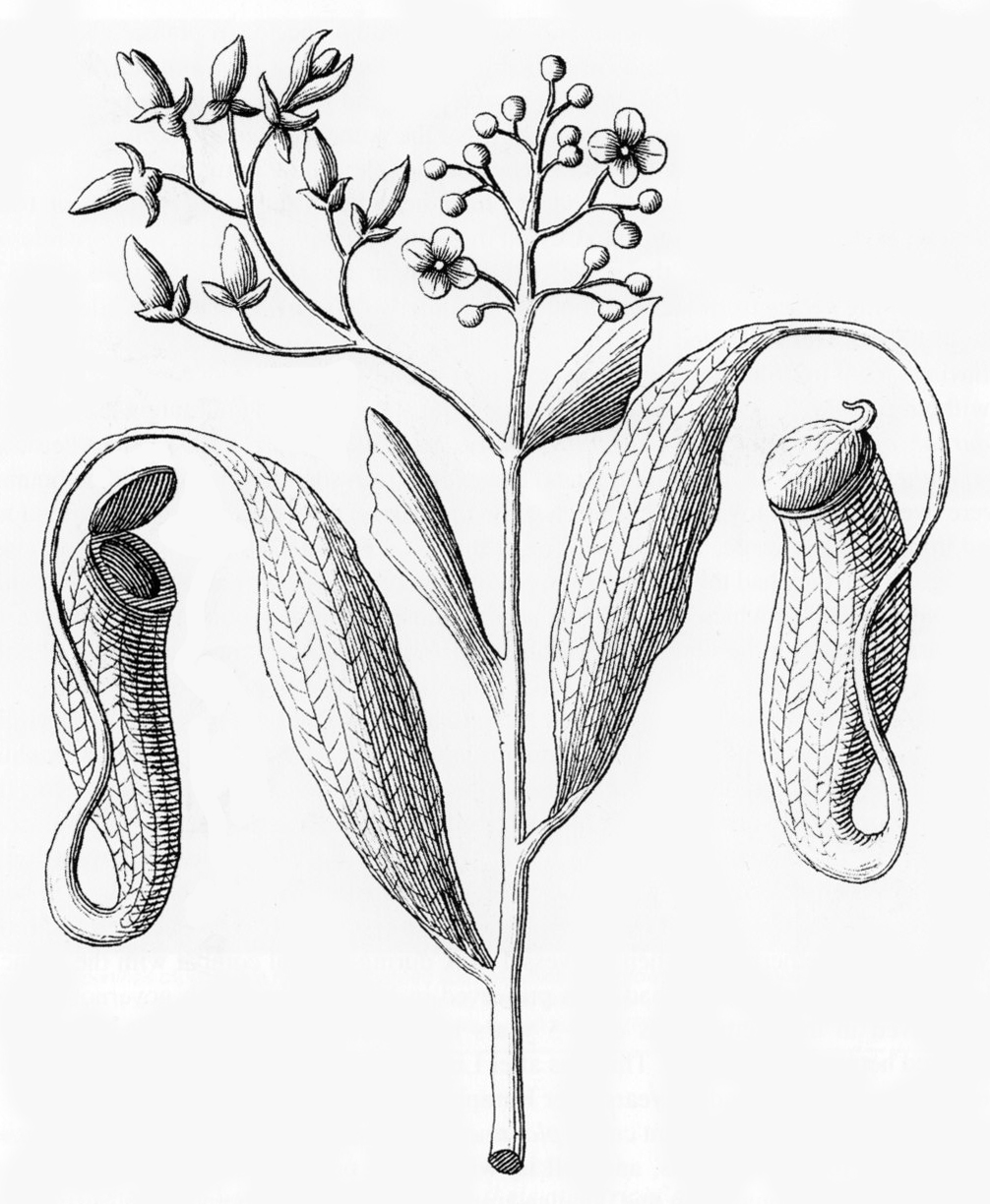
Plukenet's drawing of N. distillatoria from his Almagestum Botanicum of 1696.

The earliest known record of Nepenthes dates back to the 17th century. In 1658, French colonial governor Étienne de Flacourt published a description of a pitcher plant in his seminal work Histoire de la Grande Isle de Madagascar. It reads:

It is a plant growing about 3 feet high which carries at the end of its leaves, which are 7 inches long, a hollow flower or fruit resembling a small vase, with its own lid, a wonderful sight. There are red ones and yellow ones, the yellow being the biggest. The inhabitants of this country are reluctant to pick the flowers, saying that if somebody does pick them in passing, it will not fail to rain that day. As to that, I and all the other Frenchmen did pick them, but it did not rain. After rain these flowers are full of water, each one containing a good half-glass. [translated from French in Pitcher-Plants of Borneo]

Flacourt called the plant Amramatico, after a local name. More than a century later, this species was formally described as N. madagascariensis.

The second species to be described was N. distillatoria, the Sri Lankan endemic. In 1677, Danish physician Thomas Bartholin made brief mention of it under the name Miranda herba, Latin for "marvellous herb". Three years later, Dutch merchant Jacob Breyne referred to this species as Bandura zingalensium, after a local name for the plant. Bandura subsequently became the most commonly used name for the tropical pitcher plants, until Linnaeus coined Nepenthes in 1737.

Nepenthes distillatoria was again described in 1683, this time by Swedish physician and naturalist Herman Niklas Grim. Grim called it Planta mirabilis destillatoria or the "miraculous distilling plant", and was the first to clearly illustrate a tropical pitcher plant. Three years later, in 1686, English naturalist John Ray quoted Grim as saying:

The root draws up moisture from the earth which with the help of the sun's rays rises up into the plant itself and then flows down through the stems and nerves of the leaves into the natural utensil to be stored there until used for human needs. [translated from Latin in Pitcher-Plants of Borneo]

One of the earliest illustrations of Nepenthes appears in Leonard Plukenet's Almagestum Botanicum of 1696. The plant, called Utricaria vegetabilis zeylanensium, is undoubtedly N. distillatoria.

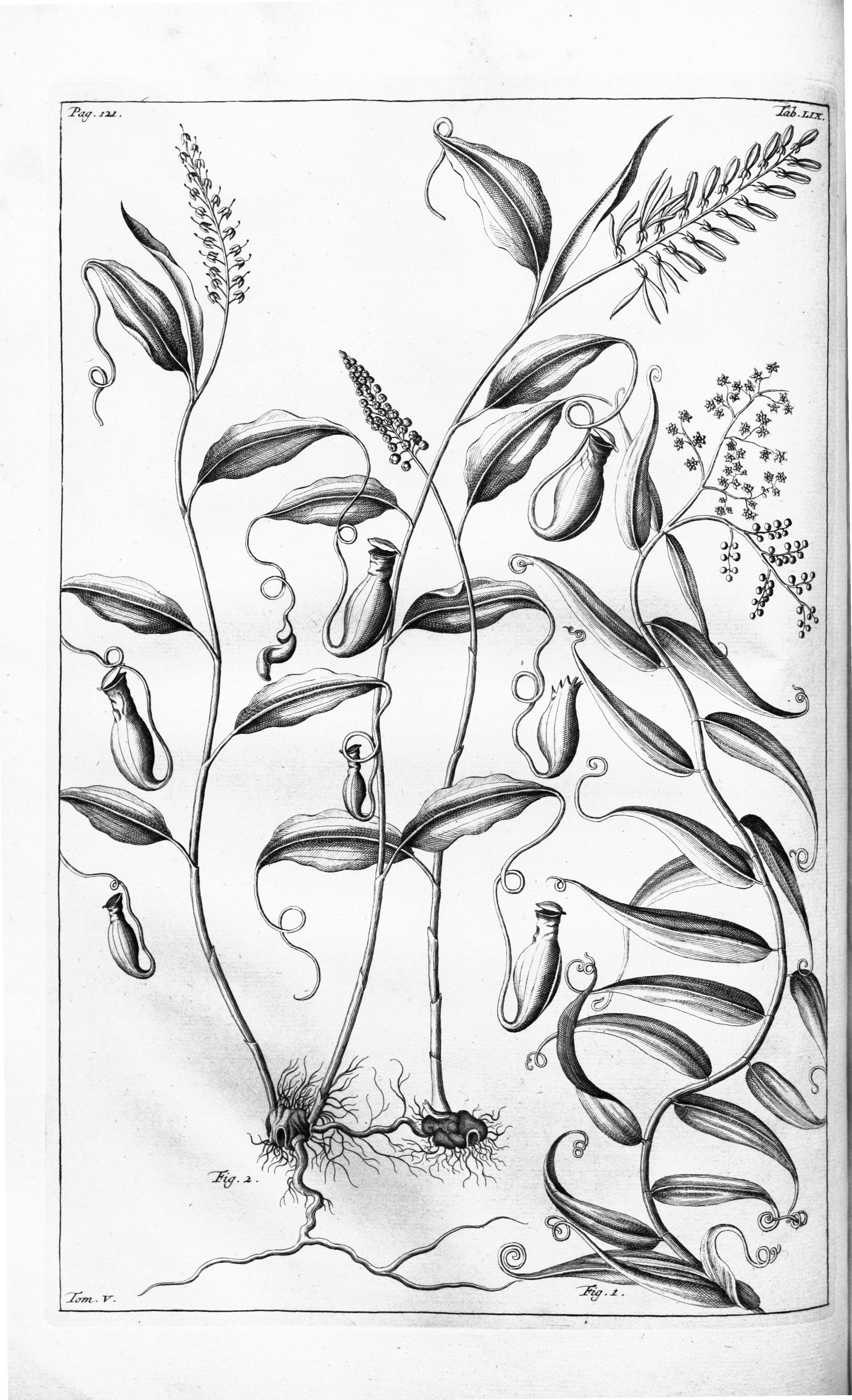
Cantharifera as illustrated in Rumphius's Herbarium Amboinensis, Volume 5, published in 1747, although probably drawn in the late 17th century. The vine on the right is not a Nepenthes, but a species of Flagellaria.

Around the same time, German botanist Georg Eberhard Rumphius discovered two new Nepenthes species in the Malay Archipelago. Rumphius illustrated the first one, now considered synonymous with N. mirabilis, and gave it the name Cantharifera, meaning "tankard-bearer". The second, referred to as Cantharifera alba, is thought to have been N. maxima. Rumphius described the plants in his most famous work, the six-volume Herbarium Amboinense, a catalogue of the flora of Ambon Island. However, it would not be published until many years after his death.

After going blind in 1670, when the manuscript was only partially complete, Rumphius continued work on Herbarium Amboinensis with the help of clerks and artists. In 1687, with the project nearing completion, at least half of the illustrations were lost in a fire. Persevering, Rumphius and his helpers first completed the book in 1690. However, two years later, the ship carrying the manuscript to the Netherlands was attacked and sunk by the French, forcing them to start over from a copy that had fortunately been retained by Governor-General Johannes Camphuijs. The Herbarium Amboinensis finally arrived in the Netherlands in 1696. Even then, the first volume did not appear until 1741, 39 years after Rumphius's death. By this time, Linnaeus's name Nepenthes had become established.

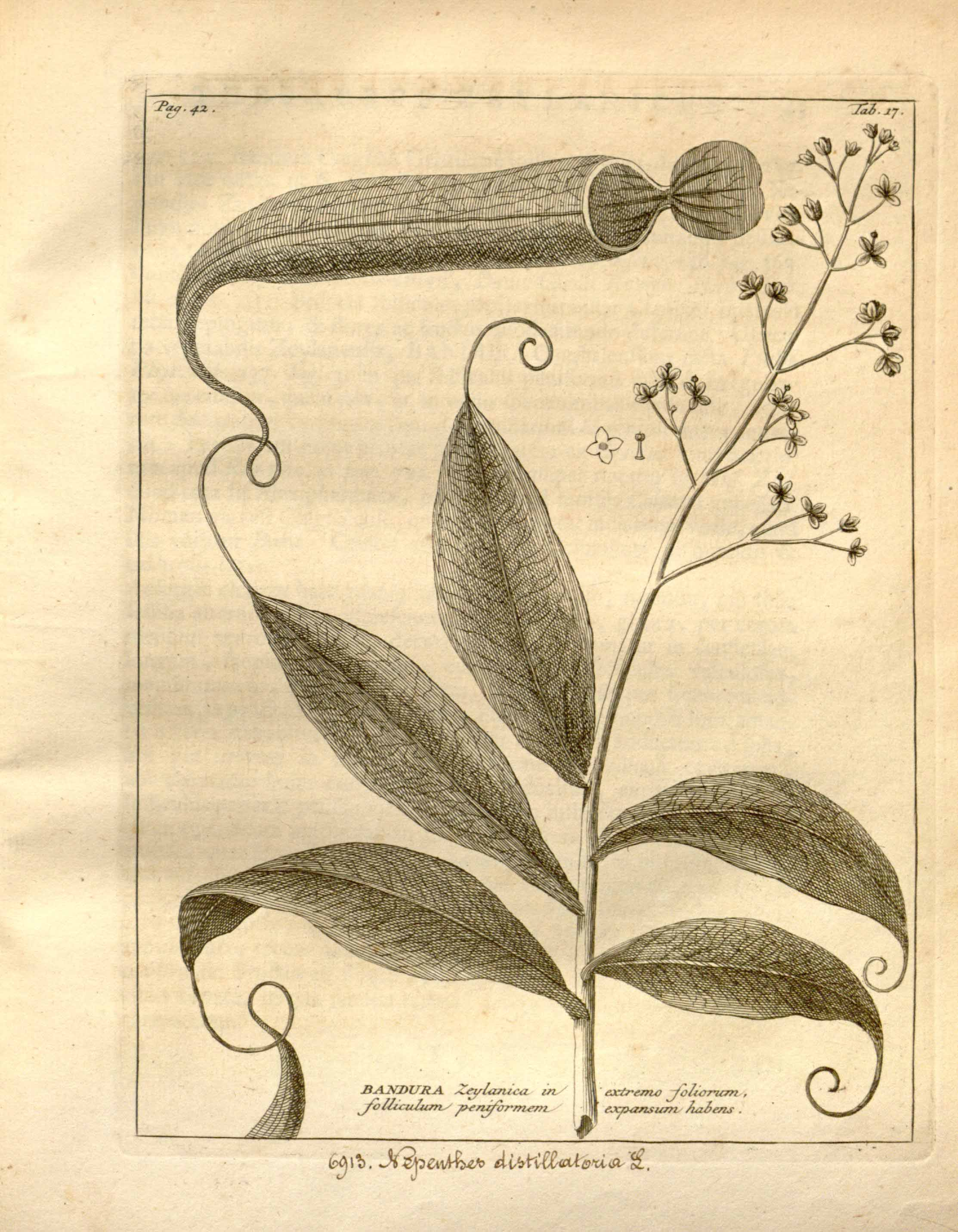
Illustration of Bandura zeylanica (N. distillatoria) from Burmann's Thesaurus Zeylanicus of 1737

Nepenthes distillatoria was again illustrated in Johannes Burmann's Thesaurus Zeylanicus of 1737. The drawing depicts the end of a flowering stem with pitchers. Burmann refers to the plant as Bandura zeylanica.

The next mention of tropical pitcher plants was made in 1790, when Portuguese priest João de Loureiro described Phyllamphora mirabilis, or the "marvellous urn-shaped leaf", from Vietnam. Despite living in the country for around 35 years, it seems unlikely that Loureiro observed living plants of this species, as he stated the lid is a moving part, actively opening and closing. In his most celebrated work, Flora Cochinchinensis, he writes:

[...] (the) leaf-tip ends in a long hanging tendril, twisted spirally in the middle, from which hangs a sort of vase, oblong, pot-bellied, with a smooth lip with a projecting margin and a lid affixed to one side, which of its own nature freely opens and closes in order to receive the dew and store it. A marvellous work of the Lord! [translated from French in Pitcher-Plants of Borneo]

Phyllamphora mirabilis was eventually transferred to the genus Nepenthes by Rafarin in 1869. As such, P. mirabilis is the basionym of this most cosmopolitan of tropical pitcher plant species.

Loureiro's description of a moving lid was repeated by Jean Louis Marie Poiret in 1797. Poiret described two of the four Nepenthes species known at the time: N. madagascariensis and N. distillatoria. He gave the former its current name and called the latter Nepente de l'Inde, or simply "Nepenthes of India", although this species is absent from the mainland. In Jean-Baptiste Lamarck's Encyclopédie Méthodique Botanique, he included the following account:

This urn is hollow, as I have just said, usually full of soft, clear water, and then closed. It opens during the day and more than half the liquid disappears, but this loss is repaired during the night, and the next day the urn is full again and closed by its lid. This is its sustenance, and enough for more than one day because it is always about half-full at the approach of night. [translated from French in Pitcher-Plants of Borneo]

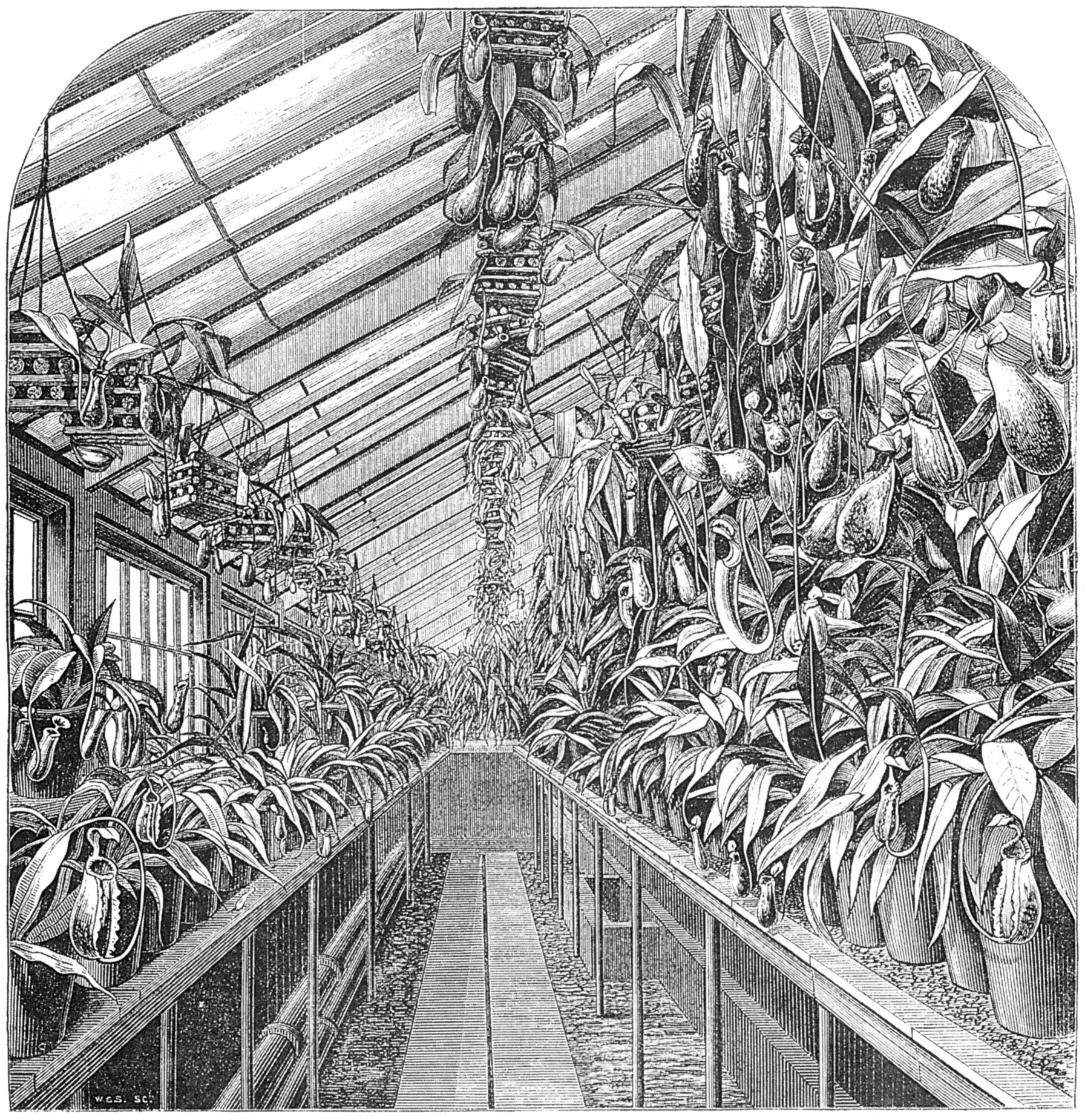
The Nepenthes house of the Veitch Nurseries as illustrated in The Gardeners' Chronicle, 1872

With the discovery of new species and Sir Joseph Banks' original introduction of specimens to Europe in 1789, interest in Nepenthes grew throughout the 19th century, culminating in what has been called the "Golden Age of Nepenthes" in the 1880s. However, the popularity of the plants dwindled in the early 20th century, before all but disappearing by World War II. This is evidenced by the fact that no new species were described between 1940 and 1966. The revival of global interest in the cultivation and study of Nepenthes is credited to Japanese botanist Shigeo Kurata, whose work in the 1960s and 1970s did much to bring attention to these plants.

== Cultivation ==
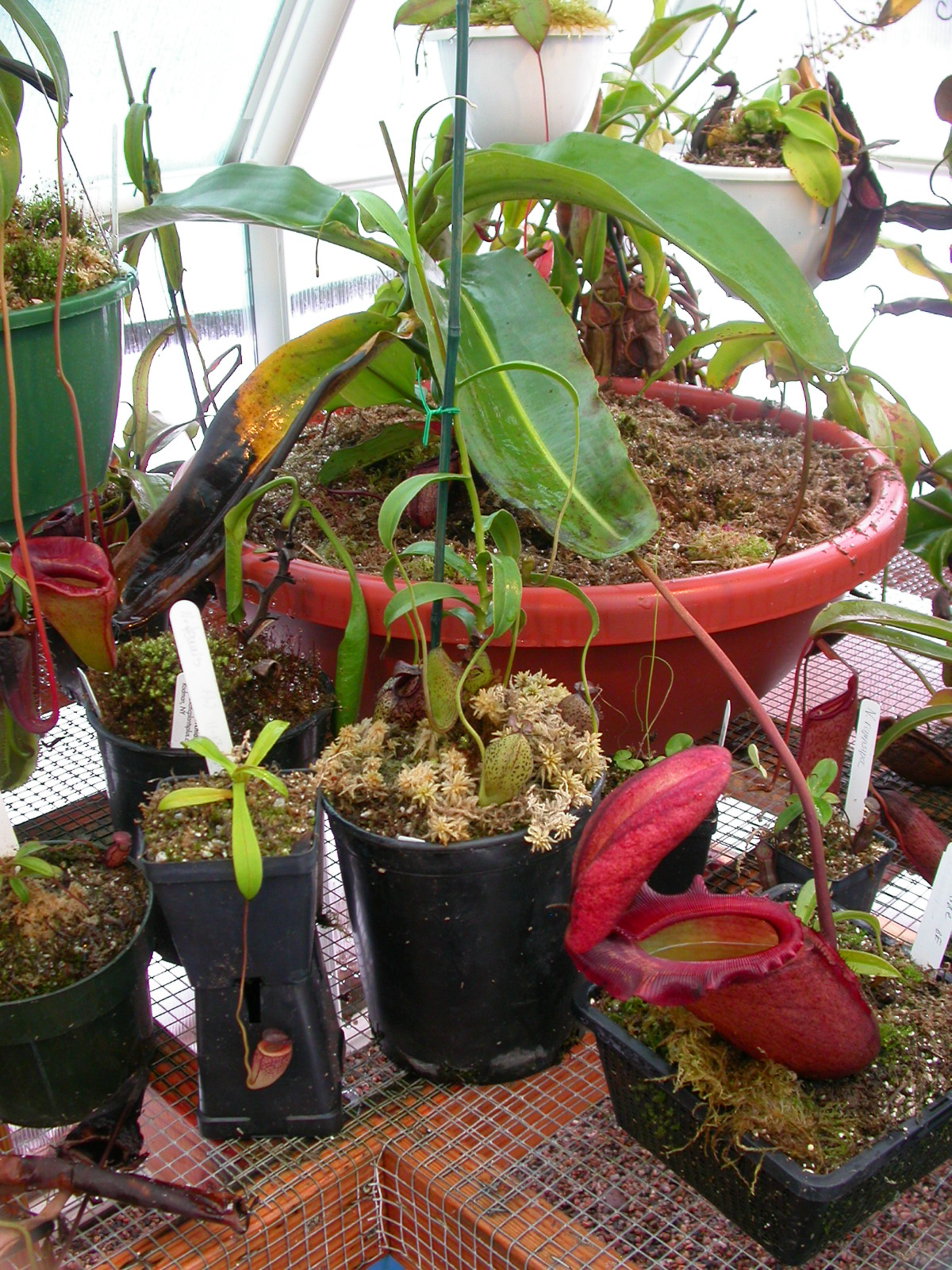
Cultivated Nepenthes rajah, Nepenthes aristolochioides and other species

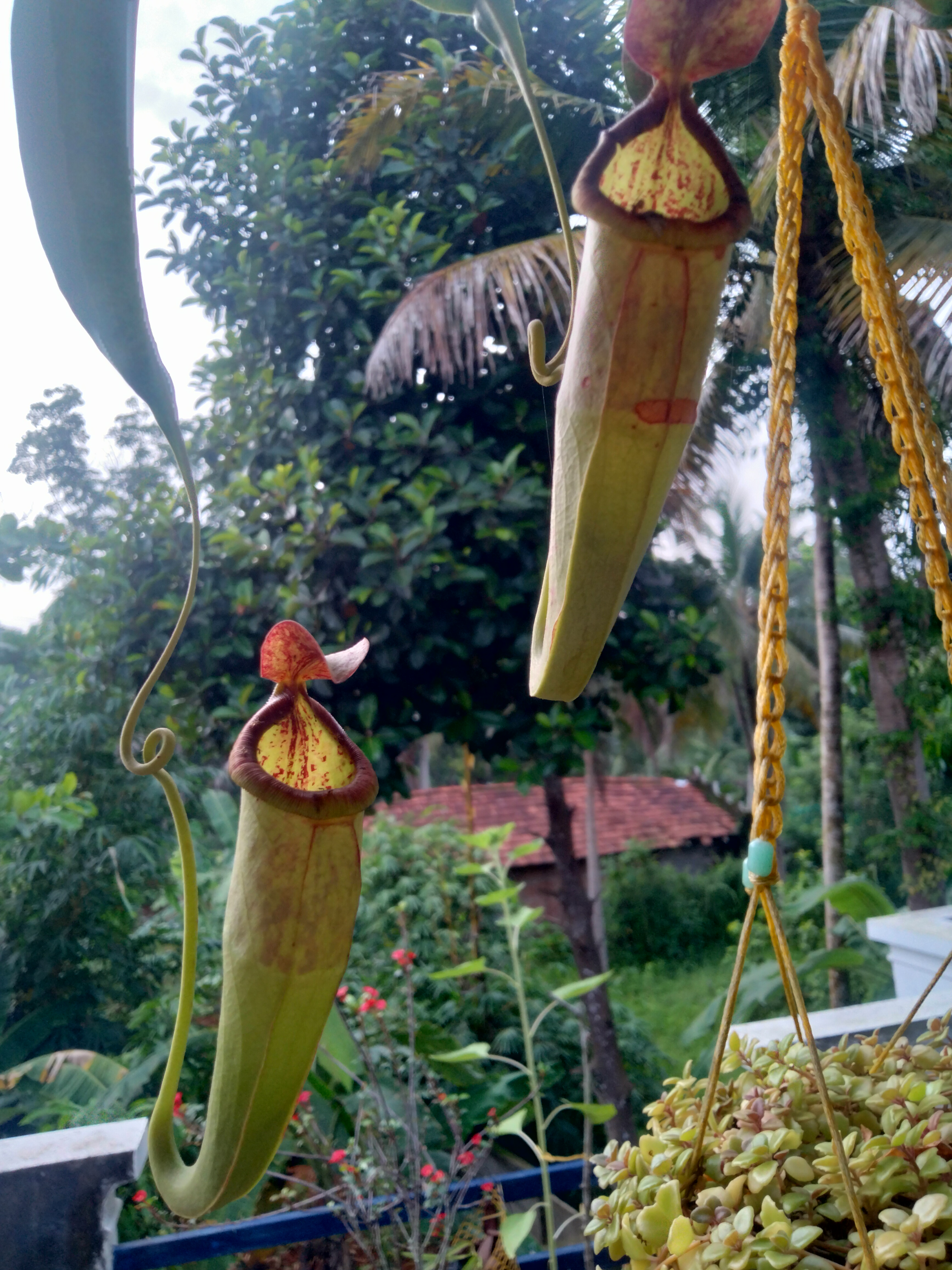
Nepenthes cultivated in a garden at Kottayam, Kerala

Nepenthes may be cultivated in greenhouses. Easier species include N. alata, N. ventricosa, N. khasiana, and N. sanguinea. These four species are highlanders (N. alata has both lowland and highland forms), some easy lowlander species are N. rafflesiana, N. bicalcarata, N. mirabilis, and N. hirsuta.

Highland forms are those species that grow in habitats generally higher in elevation, and thus exposed to cooler evening temperatures. Lowland forms are those species growing nearer to sea level. Both forms respond best to rainwater (but some tap water works as long as it is flushed monthly with rainwater or water low in dissolved solid and chemicals), bright light (though some species can grow in full sun), a well-drained medium, good air circulation and relatively high humidity, although easier species such as N. alata can adapt to lower humidity environments. Highland species must have night-time cooling to thrive in the long term. Chemical fertilisers are best used at low strength. Occasional feeding with frozen (thawed before use) crickets may be beneficial. Terrarium culture of smaller plants, such as N. bellii, N. × trichocarpa and N. ampullaria, is possible, but most plants will get too large over time.

Plants can be propagated by seed, cuttings, and tissue culture. Seeds are usually sown on damp chopped Sphagnum moss, or on sterile plant tissue culture media once they have been properly disinfected. The seeds generally become nonviable soon after harvesting, so seed are not usually the preferred method of propagation. A 1:1 mixture of orchid medium with moss or perlite has been used for germination and culture. Seed may take two months to germinate, and two years or more to yield mature plants. Cuttings may be rooted in damp Sphagnum moss in a plastic bag or tank with high humidity and moderate light. They can begin to root in one to two months and start to form pitchers in about six months. Tissue culture is now used commercially and helps reduce collection of wild plants, as well as making many rare species available to hobbyists at reasonable prices. Nepenthes species are considered threatened or endangered plants and all of them are listed in CITES Appendix II, with the exception of N. rajah and N. khasiana which are listed in CITES Appendix I. The CITES listing means all international trade (including in parts and derivatives) is controlled by the CITES permitting system, with wild sourced specimens of Appendix I species prohibited from commercial international trade.

== Hybrids and cultivars ==
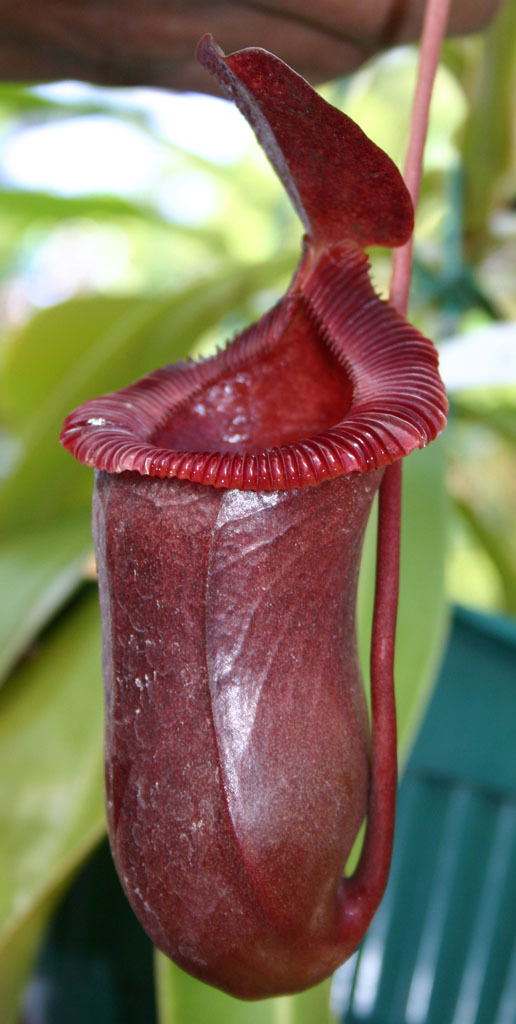
The complex man-made hybrid N. ventricosa × (N. lowii × N. macrophylla)

There are many hybrid Nepenthes and numerous named cultivars. Some of the more well-known, artificially produced hybrids and cultivars include:

- N. × coccinea ((N. rafflesiana × N. ampullaria) × N. mirabilis)
- N. × ventrata (N. ventricosa × N. alata)
- N. × 'Bloody Mary' (N. ventricosa × N. ampullaria)
- N. 'D'amato' (N. lowii × N. ventricosa)
- N. × mixta (N. northiana × N. maxima)
- N. 'Syurga' (N. ventricosa × N. northiana)
- N. 'Menarik' (N. rafflesiana × N. veitchii)
- N. 'Emmarene' (N. khasiana × N. ventricosa)
- N. 'Judith Finn' (N. spathulata × N. veitchii)
- N. 'Gaya' (N. khasiana × (N. ventricosa × N. maxima))

== See also ==
- Nepenthes classification
- Nepenthes infauna
- List of Nepenthes endophyte species
