= List of environmental organizations =

An environmental organization is an organization coming out of the conservation or environmental movements that seeks to protect, analyze or monitor the environment against misuse or degradation from human forces.

In this sense the environment may refer to the biophysical environment or the natural environment. The organization may be a charity, a trust, a non-governmental organization, a governmental organization or an intergovernmental organization. Environmental organizations can be global, national, regional or local. Some environmental issues that environmental organizations focus on include pollution, plastic pollution, waste, resource depletion, human overpopulation and climate change.

== Global organizations ==
- Global Alliance on Health and Pollution (GAHP)
- Global Biodiversity Information Facility (GBIF)
- School strike for climate or Fridays for Future (FFF)
- Global Green Growth Institute (GGGI)
- Intergovernmental Panel on Climate Change (IPCC)
- International Union for Conservation of Nature (IUCN)
- United Nations Environment Programme (UNEP)
- European Environment Agency (EEA)
- Partnerships in Environmental Management for the Seas of East Asia (PEMSEA)

== Governmental agencies ==
Many states have agencies devoted to monitoring and protecting the environment:

Bangladesh

- Ministry of Environment, Forest and Climate Change (Bangladesh)

Netherlands

- Ministry of Climate Policy and Green Growth
- Ministry of Infrastructure and Water Management
- Staatsbosbeheer

New Zealand

- Parliamentary Commissioner for the Environment

Nigeria

- Kano State Environmental Planning and Protection Agency

Saudi Arabia

- Saudi Environmental Society

South Africa

- CapeNature
- Eastern Cape Parks
- Ezemvelo KZN Wildlife
- Limpopo Tourism and Parks Board
- Mpumalanga Parks Board
- North West Parks and Tourism Board
- South African National Parks

Switzerland

- Federal Office for the Environment

United States

- Environmental Protection Agency
- Fish and Wildlife Service
- National Park Service
- Inter-Tribal Environmental Council

== International non-governmental organizations ==
These organizations are involved in environmental management, lobbying, advocacy, and/or conservation efforts:

=== International ===
- 350.org
- African Conservation Foundation
- African Wildlife Foundation
- A Rocha
- Anti-nuclear movement
- Arab Forum for Environment and Development
- American Forests
- Bergwaldprojekt
- Bioversity International
- BirdLife International
- Blue Marine Foundation
- Botanic Gardens Conservation International
- CEE Bankwatch Network
- Center for Development and Strategy
- Citizens' Climate Lobby
- Climate Action Network
- Climate Cardinals
- Community Forests International
- Confederation of European Environmental Engineering Societies
- Conservation International
- Dancing Star Foundation
- DarkSky International
- Deep Green Resistance
- Dian Fossey Gorilla Fund International
- Earth Charter Initiative
- EARTHDAY.ORG
- Earthwatch
- Environmental Defense Fund
- Extinction Rebellion
- Fauna and Flora International
- Fondation Pacifique
- Foundation for Environmental Education
- Forest Stewardship Council
- Forests and the European Union Resource Network
- Frankfurt Zoological Society
- Friends of Nature
- Friends of the Earth
- Global Footprint Network
- Global Landscapes Forum
- Global Witness
- GoodPlanet Foundation
- Great Transition Initiative
- Green Actors of West Africa
- Green Africa Youth Organization (GAYO)
- Green Cross International
- GreenFaith
- Greenpeace
- Green Belt Movement
- Group for the Environment, Renewable Energy and Solidarity
- IDEAS For Us
- Interamerican Association for Environmental Defense
- International Analog Forestry Network
- International Institute for Environment and Development
- International Rivers
- International Tree Foundation
- International Union for Conservation of Nature
- Let's Do It! World
- Marine Stewardship Council
- Miss Earth
- NatureServe
- Oceana
- Panthera Corporation
- Partners in Population and Development
- Plant A Tree Today Foundation
- Pragya
- Programme for the Endorsement of Forest Certification
- Project AWARE
- Rainforest Action Network
- Rainforest Alliance
- Rainforest Foundation Fund
- Rainforest Foundation UK
- Rainforest Foundation US
- Rainforest Trust
- Rewilding Europe
- Sandwatch
- Save the Elephants
- Sea Shepherd
- Seeds of Survival
- Society for the Environment
- Society for the Protection of Underground Networks
- Surfrider Foundation
- The Climate Reality Project
- The Mountain Institute
- The Nature Conservancy
- The Earth Organization
- This is My Earth
- Traffic (conservation programme)
- Tree Aid
- WePlanet
- Wetlands International
- WILD Foundation
- Wildlife Conservation Society
- World Business Council for Sustainable Development
- World Land Trust
- World Resources Institute
- World Union for Protection of Life
- World Wide Fund for Nature
- Worldwatch Institute
- Xerces Society
- Yellowstone to Yukon Conservation Initiative
- Young Friends of the Earth
- Zoological Society of London

=== Continental ===
==== Africa ====
- Environmental Foundation for Africa
- Women Environment Programme

==== Europe ====
- Bioenergy Europe
- ClientEarth
- Climate Action Network – Europe (CAN-Europe)
- Coastwatch Europe
- European Environmental Bureau
- European Wildlife
- Generation Climate Europe

==== North America ====
- Aytzim: Ecological Judaism
- Fund for Wild Nature
- Dutch Caribbean Nature Alliance
- International Joint Commission
- National Cleanup Day
- North American Native Fishes Association
- Rivers Without Borders
- Sierra Club
- Stand.earth

==== East Asia ====
- Greenpeace East Asia
- Global Green Growth Institute

==== Southeast Asia ====
- ASEAN Centre for Biodiversity
- Green Life Environmental Conservation and Social Development Group
- Greenpeace Southeast Asia
- Rainforest Foundation Norway
- Wild Asia

== National non-governmental organizations ==
These organizations are involved in environmental management, lobbying, advocacy, and/or conservation efforts at the national level:

=== Albania ===
- Institute for Environmental Policy in Albania

=== Australia ===
- Australian Conservation Foundation
- Australian Koala Foundation
- Australian Network of Environmental Defenders Offices
- Australian Student Environment Network
- Australian Youth Climate Coalition
- Australian Wildlife Conservancy
- Blue Mountains Conservation Society
- Bush Heritage Australia
- Blue Wedges
- CERES Community Environment Park
- Clean Ocean Foundation
- Environment Victoria
- Foundation for National Parks & Wildlife
- Greening Australia
- Keep Australia Beautiful
- Public Transport Users Association
- Birds Australia
- The Sunrise Project
- The Wilderness Society (Australia)
- Wildlife Watch Australia

=== Austria ===
- Transitforum Austria Tirol

=== Bangladesh ===
- Bangladesh Environmental Lawyers Association

=== Belgium ===
- Corporate Europe Observatory

=== Bolivia ===
- Comunidad Inti Wara Yassi (CIWY)
- Conservation International Bolivia

=== Botswana ===
- Botswana Predator Conservation Trust
- Conservation International Botswana

=== Brazil ===
- Conservation International Brazil

=== Cambodia ===
- Angkor Centre for Conservation of Biodiversity
- Conservation International Cambodia
- Free the Bears Fund
- Save Cambodia's Wildlife

=== Canada ===
- Ancient Forest Alliance
- Bird Protection Quebec
- Canadian Association of Physicians for the Environment
- Canadian Environmental Law Association
- Canadian Environmental Network
- Canadian Parks and Wilderness Society
- Canadian Youth Climate Coalition
- David Suzuki Foundation
- Earth Liberation Army (ELA)
- Earth Rangers
- Ecojustice Canada
- Energy Probe
- Green Action Centre
- Manitoba Eco-Network
- Nature Canada
- Nature Conservancy of Canada
- Ontario Nature
- Pembina Institute
- Regenesis (non-profit organization)
- Sierra Club Canada
- Sierra Youth Coalition
- The Society for the Preservation of Wild Culture
- Stand.earth
- Toronto Environmental Alliance (TEA)
- Western Canada Wilderness Committee
- Wildlife Conservation Society Canada
- WWF-Canada

=== Cape Verde ===
- Quercus Cabo Verde

=== Chile ===
- Cetacean Conservation Center
- CODEFF
- Modatima

=== China ===
- China greentech initiative
- Conservation International China
- Friends of Nature (China)
- Green Camel Bell
- Greenpeace East Asia

=== Colombia ===
- Conservation International Colombia
- Fundación ProAves

=== Costa Rica ===
- Acción de Lucha Anti-Petrola
- Conservation International Costa Rica

=== Croatia ===
- Ekološko društvo Zeleni Osijek

=== Czech Republic ===
- Hnutí Brontosaurus
- Hnutí DUHA – Friends of the Earth Czech Republic

=== Denmark ===
- Danish Organisation for Renewable Energy (OVE)

=== Ecuador ===
- Conservation International Ecuador

=== Estonia ===
- Estonian Nature Fund
- Tartu Students' Nature Conservation Circle

=== Ethiopia ===
- Population, health, and the environment (PHE)
- SOS Sahel Ethiopia

=== Fiji ===
- Conservation International Fiji

=== Finland ===
- Finnish Association for Nature Conservation
- Finnish Natural Heritage Foundation

=== France ===
- France Nature Environnement
- GoodPlanet Foundation
- Water and Rivers of Brittany

=== Germany ===
- Bund für Umwelt und Naturschutz Deutschland
- BUNDjugend
- EarthLink e.V.
- Ende Gelände
- Ethecon Foundation
- Fuck for Forest
- German Foundation for World Population
- Global Nature Fund
- The Heinz Sielmann Foundation
- Naturschutzbund Deutschland
- Robin Wood

=== Greece ===
- ARCHELON, the Sea Turtle Protection Society of Greece
- Mediterranean Association to Save the Sea Turtles (MEDASSET)

=== Guyana ===
- Conservation International Guyana
- WWF Guianas

=== Hong Kong ===
- Clean Air Network
- Clear the Air (Hong Kong)
- The Conservancy Association
- The Climate Group
- Friends of the Earth (HK)
- Green Council
- Green Power
- Greenpeace
- Lights Out Hong Kong
- Society for Protection of the Harbour
- WWF Hong Kong

=== Hungary ===
- Göncöl Foundation

=== India ===
- Agency for Non-conventional Energy and Rural Technology (ANERT)
- Association for Social and Environmental Development
- Awaaz Foundation
- Bombay Natural History Society (BNHS)
- Centre for Science and Environment (CSE)
- Conserve
- Dolphin Nature Conservation Society
- The Energy and Resources Institute
- Environment Conservation Group
- Environmentalist Foundation of India
- Friends of Snakes Society
- Ganga Mahasabha
- Leaf Bank
- Madras Naturalists' Society
- MigrantWatch
- National Tiger Conservation Authority
- Nature Club Surat
- Nature Conservation Foundation
- Nature Forever Society
- Nilgiri Wildlife and Environment Association
- Pasumai Thaayagam TNPT
- Poovulagin Nanbargal
- Pragya India
- Save Ganga Movement
- Snow Leopard Conservancy India Trust
- Vanashakti
- Vindhyan Ecology and Natural History Foundation
- Wildlife Research and Conservation Trust
- WWF-India

=== Indonesia ===
- Borneo Orangutan Survival Foundation
- Fire Free Alliance
- Gili Eco Trust
- The Indonesian Forum for Environment
- Konservasi Indonesia
- Masarang Foundation
- Mangrove Care Forum Bali
- Organisation for the Preservation of Birds and their Habitat
- Sumatran Orangutan Conservation Programme
- Yayasan Merah Putih

=== Iraq ===
- Nature Iraq

=== Ireland ===
- Gluaiseacht
- Irish Bee Conservation Project
- Irish Peatland Conservation Council (IPCC)
- Native Woodland Trust
- Tramore Eco Group

=== Israel ===
- Council for a Beautiful Israel
- Israel Union for Environmental Defense
- Society for the Protection of Nature in Israel
- Zalul Environmental Association

=== Italy ===
- Legambiente
- LIPU

=== Kenya ===
- Big Life Foundation
- Conservation International Kenya
- Green Belt Movement
- Pragya Kenya
- Sheldrick Wildlife Trust
- Trees4Goals (Lesein Mutunkei)
- Tsavo Trust

=== Korea ===
- Friends of the Earth Korea
- Global Green Growth Institute
- Korean Federation for Environmental Movement
- Korean Mountain Preservation League

=== Liberia ===
- Conservation International Liberia

=== North Macedonia ===
- Macedonian Ecological Society

=== Madagascar ===
- Blue Ventures
- Conservation International Madagascar
- Kew Madagascar Conservation Centre
- Madagascar Fauna and Flora Group

=== Malawi ===
- Mulanje Mountain Conservation Trust

=== Malaysia ===
- Malaysian Conservation Alliance for Tigers
- Malaysian Nature Society

=== Malta ===
- BirdLife Malta
- Friends of the Earth (Malta)

=== Mexico ===
- Amigos del Pandeño
- Conservation International Mexico
- Mexican Network of People Affected by Mining
- Pronatura México
- Pronatura Noreste

=== Namibia ===
- African Wild Dog Conservancy (Namibia)
- Cheetah Conservation Fund
- Harnas Wildlife Foundation
- Ocean Conservation Namibia

=== Nepal ===
- International Centre for Integrated Mountain Development
- National Trust for Nature Conservation

=== Netherlands ===
- Dutch Society for the Protection of Animals
- Global Forest Coalition
- Milieudefensie
- Rutgers WPF

=== New Caledonia ===
- Conservation International New Caledonia

=== New Zealand ===
- Buller Conservation Group
- Conservation International Aotearoa
- Environment and Conservation Organisations of Aotearoa New Zealand
- Forest & Bird
- Kea Conservation Trust
- Live Ocean
- Native Forest Restoration Trust
- New Zealand Ecological Restoration Network
- New Zealand Institute of Environmental Health
- New Zealand Plant Conservation Network
- OceansWatch
- Our Seas Our Future
- Predator Free New Zealand Trust
- Project Jonah
- Royal Forest and Bird Protection Society of New Zealand
- Save Happy Valley Campaign
- Waipoua Forest Trust

=== Norway ===
- Bellona Foundation
- Eco-Agents
- Green Warriors of Norway
- Nature and Youth
- Norwegian Society for the Conservation of Nature
- Zero Emission Resource Organisation

=== Pakistan ===
- Himalayan Wildlife Foundation
- Pakistan Crane Center, Lakki Marwat
- WWF–Pakistan

=== Palestine ===
- Palestine Wildlife Society
- Palestinian Environmental NGOs Network

=== Panama ===
- ANCON
- APROVACA
- Smithsonian Tropical Research Institute

=== Peru ===
- Conservation International Peru
- Interethnic Association for the Development of the Peruvian Rainforest

=== Philippines ===
- Alyansa Tigil Mina
- Conservation International Philippines
- Haribon Foundation
- Iligan Bay Alliance of Misamis Occidental
- Katala Foundation
- Mabuwaya
- Philippine Native Plants Conservation Society
- Philippine Tarsier Foundation
- Sibuyanons Against Mining

=== Poland ===
- Workshop for All Beings

=== Portugal ===
- Quercus

=== Puerto Rico ===
- Casa Pueblo
- Para La Naturaleza

=== Romania ===
- StrawberryNet

=== Samoa ===
- Conservation International Samoa
- Samoa Conservation Society

=== Seychelles ===
- Nature Protection Trust of Seychelles
- Nature Seychelles

=== Sierra Leone ===
- ENFORAC (Environmental Forum for Action)

=== Singapore ===
- Nature Society (Singapore)

=== South Africa ===
- Conservation South Africa
- Cape Town Ecology Group
- Dolphin Action & Protection Group
- The Earth Organization
- Earthlife Africa
- Endangered Wildlife Trust
- EThekwini ECOPEACE
- Koeberg Alert
- Natural Justice: Lawyers for Communities and the Environment
- Wildlife & Environment Society

=== South Korea ===
- Birds Korea
- Korean Mountain Preservation League

=== Spain ===
- Asociación pola defensa da ría
- Canary Islands Network for Protected Natural Areas

=== Sri Lanka ===
- Environmental Foundation Limited
- Wildlife and Nature Protection Society

=== Suriname ===
- Conservation International Suriname

=== Switzerland ===
- Eaternity
- Ecology and Population
- Pro Natura
- Pro Specie Rara
- Swiss Association for the Protection of Birds
- Swiss Association for Transport and Environment

=== Tanzania ===
- Tanzania Environmental Conservation Society (TECOSO Tanzania)
- Wildlife Conservation Society of Tanzania

=== Thailand ===
- Elephant Reintroduction Foundation

=== Timor-Leste ===
- Conservation International Timor-Leste

=== Trinidad and Tobago ===
- Nature Seekers
- Pointe-à-Pierre Wild Fowl Trust

=== Turkey ===
- Akdeniz Koruma Derneği
- Doğa
- KuzeyDoğa
- Right to Clean Air Platform Turkey
- Turkish Foundation for Combating Soil Erosion

=== Uganda ===
- Budongo Conservation Field Station
- Conservation Through Public Health
- Uganda Conservation Foundation

=== Ukraine ===
- Ukraine Nature Conservation Society (UkrTOP)

=== United Arab Emirates ===
- Emirates Environmental Group
- Mohamed bin Zayed Species Conservation Fund
- Zayed International Foundation for the Environment

=== United Kingdom ===
- Agroforestry Research Trust
- Association for Environment Conscious Building
- Bat Conservation Trust
- Bicycology
- BioRegional
- Botanical Society of Britain and Ireland
- British Ecological Society
- British Mycological Society
- British Phycological Society
- British Trust for Ornithology
- Buglife
- Bumblebee Conservation Trust
- Butterfly Conservation
- Campaign for Better Transport
- Campaign for National Parks (CNP)
- Campaign for the Protection of Rural Wales
- Campaign to Protect Rural England (CPRE)
- Canal & River Trust
- Centre for Alternative Technology (CAT)
- Chartered Institution of Water and Environmental Management (CIWEM)
- The Civic Trust
- The Corner House
- The Conservation Volunteers
- Earth Liberation Front (ELF)
- Earth Liberation Prisoner Support Network (ELPSN)
- Earthworm Society of Britain
- Environmental Investigation Agency
- Environmental Justice Foundation
- Environmental Law Foundation (ELF)
- Environmental Protection UK
- The Facilities Society (sustainable facilities)
- Forest Peoples Programme
- Friends of the Earth
- Garden Organic
- Green Alliance
- Green Wood Centre
- Groundwork UK
- Hardy Plant Society
- The Institution of Environmental Sciences
- John Muir Trust
- Keep Britain Tidy
- Light Foot Enterprises
- The Mammal Society
- Manx National Heritage
- Marine Conservation Society
- National Biodiversity Network
- National Fruit Collection
- National Trust for Places of Historic Interest or Natural Beauty
- National Trust for Scotland
- Open Spaces Society
- People & Planet
- People's Trust for Endangered Species
- Permaculture Association
- Plane Stupid
- Plantlife
- Population Matters
- Possible
- The Ramblers
- Residents Against SARP Pollution
- The Rivers Trust
- Royal Forestry Society
- Royal Horticultural Society
- RSPB (Royal Society for the Protection of Birds)
- Scottish Wildlife Trust
- Society for the Protection of Ancient Buildings
- Soil Association
- Stop Climate Chaos
- Sustrans
- Town and Country Planning Association
- The Tree Register
- UK Environmental Law Association (UKELA)
- UK Student Climate Network (UKSCN)
- Vincent Wildlife Trust
- Whale and Dolphin Conservation Society
- Wildlife and Countryside Link
- Wildfowl & Wetlands Trust
- The Wildlife Trusts
- Woodland Trust

=== Zimbabwe ===
- Akashinga

== See also ==
- Environmentalism
- List of animal rights groups
- List of nature conservation organizations
- List of environmental films
- List of environmental ministries
- List of green political parties
- List of population concern organizations
- List of renewable energy organizations
- List of environmental organisations topics
- List of international environmental agreements
