= Pragya (disambiguation) =

Pragya is a development organisation.

Pragya may also refer to:

- Pragya Singh Thakur, Indian politician
- Pragya Yadav, Swedish model
