= Quercus Cabo Verde =

- Company type: Public
- Industry: environmental protection
- Founded: 2016
- Headquarters: Praia, Cape Verde
- Key people: Paulo Ferreira
- Website: Official website

Quercus Cabo Verde is a Capeverdean branch of the Portuguese environmental organization Quercus. It is headquartered in the capital city of Praia. Its logo features the grey-headed kingfisher. The first and current head is Paulo Ferreira.

Quercus Cabo Verde is the first independent environmental organization in the country.

== History ==
The organization was prepared on February 17, 2016 at 6:00 PM for the first time to the public at the National Assembly of the national parliament. João Branco, president of the Portuguese environmental group Quercus was guest and gave a welcoming address.

The Capeverdean Ministry of Environment also supported the organization, minister Antero Veiga welcomed this initiative to help develop the environmental protection in Cape Verde.

== Objectives ==
The objectives are aimed to protecting the environment including naming threats to nature and environment in the islands and waste reduction. It also promotes renewable energy.

== See also ==
- List of companies of Cape Verde
- List of environmental organizations
