= Bergwaldprojekt =

Environmental protection organization

- Formation: 1987
- Purpose: Protection, preservation, and care of forests through volunteer work
- Headquarters: Trin, Graubünden (headquarters of the Swiss foundation) and Würzburg
- Members: approx. 2,500 supporters
- Chairpersons: Martin Kreilinger (CEO Switzerland) and Stephen Wehner (Chairman Germany)
- Website: www.bergwaldprojekt.de www.bergwaldprojekt.ch

Bergwaldprojekt is a multinational environmental protection organization (NGO) that works with volunteers in forest ecosystems. It is focused on protection, preservation, and care of forests, especially mountain forests and cultural landscapes.

== History ==
The Bergwaldprojekt was founded in 1987 by Swiss forester Renato Ruf and German Greenpeace employee Wolfgang Lohbeck in Switzerland. The first operation took place in Malans in the Canton of Graubünden. Initially, the project received organizational and financial support from the WWF and Greenpeace. By 1990, both organizations allowed the initiative to become independent. In Switzerland, the organization is structured as a charitable foundation under the supervision of the Federal Department of Home Affairs. In 1993, the German association was founded to independently finance and manage projects that had been ongoing in Germany since 1991. The first operation in Austria occurred in 1994, and in the Principality of Liechtenstein in 2004. Since 2007, there have been several project weeks each year in Catalonia. From 2006 to 2015, there were also several one-week projects annually in the Carpathians of Ukraine.

In 2020, the Bergwaldprojekt, together with the Greenpeace Environmental Foundation, purchased 200 hectares of forest land near Unterschönau in the Thuringian Forest, including the former Moosburg castle site. The "Future Forest" project involves converting a monoculture of spruce trees, which is not adapted to the climate crisis, into a more natural forest management system modeled after the Lübeck City Forest.

== Activities ==
The organization conducts one-week work assignments throughout the year for forestry laypersons in Switzerland, Austria, Liechtenstein, Germany, and Catalonia. The project sites range from the mountain forests of the Alps and Pyrenees to mid-mountain ranges such as the Black Forest, Rhön, and Harz, to the island forests of Amrum and coastal forests on the Baltic Sea. The organization works only in public forests or on land owned by charitable organizations, or as in Germany, part of the National Natural Heritage. The various tasks during a project week include forest maintenance, young growth maintenance, construction of hiking trails, reforestation of protective forest, measures to protect against browsing damage, fence construction, building of tripods (to reduce snow movement), erosion control, landscape and biotope maintenance, and peatland restoration. Projects in Germany focuses on forest conversion.

== Organization ==
The project is organized in Switzerland as a foundation, in Germany and Spain as independent associations, and in Austria under the umbrella of the Austrian Alpine Club. The project is financed through private donations, which accounted for 6% of the funding in Germany in 2020 (2018: 5%), as well as through supporting memberships (2020: 6%; 2018: 7%). 35% of the revenues were generated through the project work itself (2018: 62%). In 2020, the German Bergwaldprojekt received a bequest of €1,025,941 (26%). The remaining revenues come from contributions from companies and institutions, public funds, and in-kind donations.

In 2020, expenditures were divided into direct project costs (43%), personnel expenses (39%), and other costs (including public relations and infrastructure).

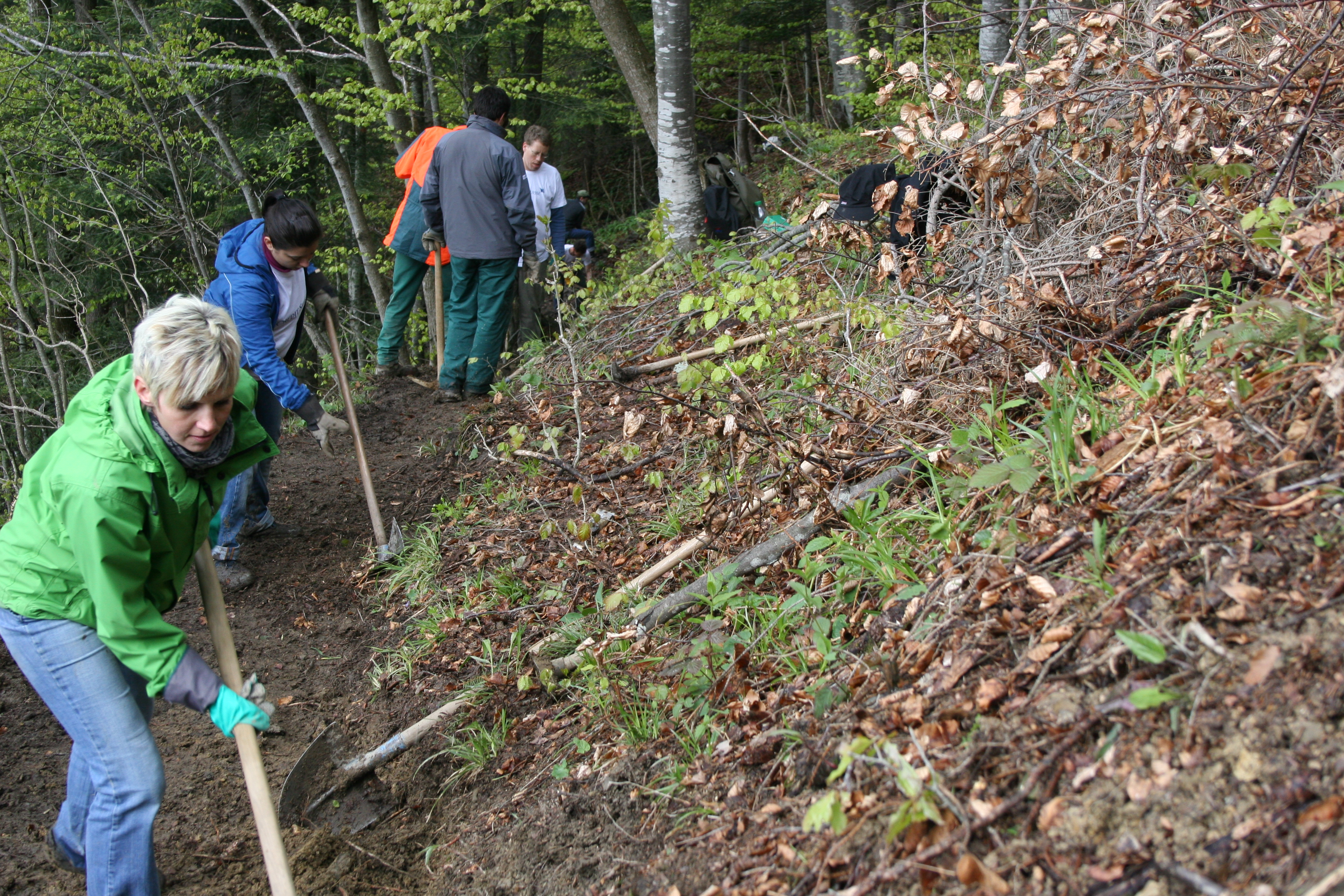
Trail construction

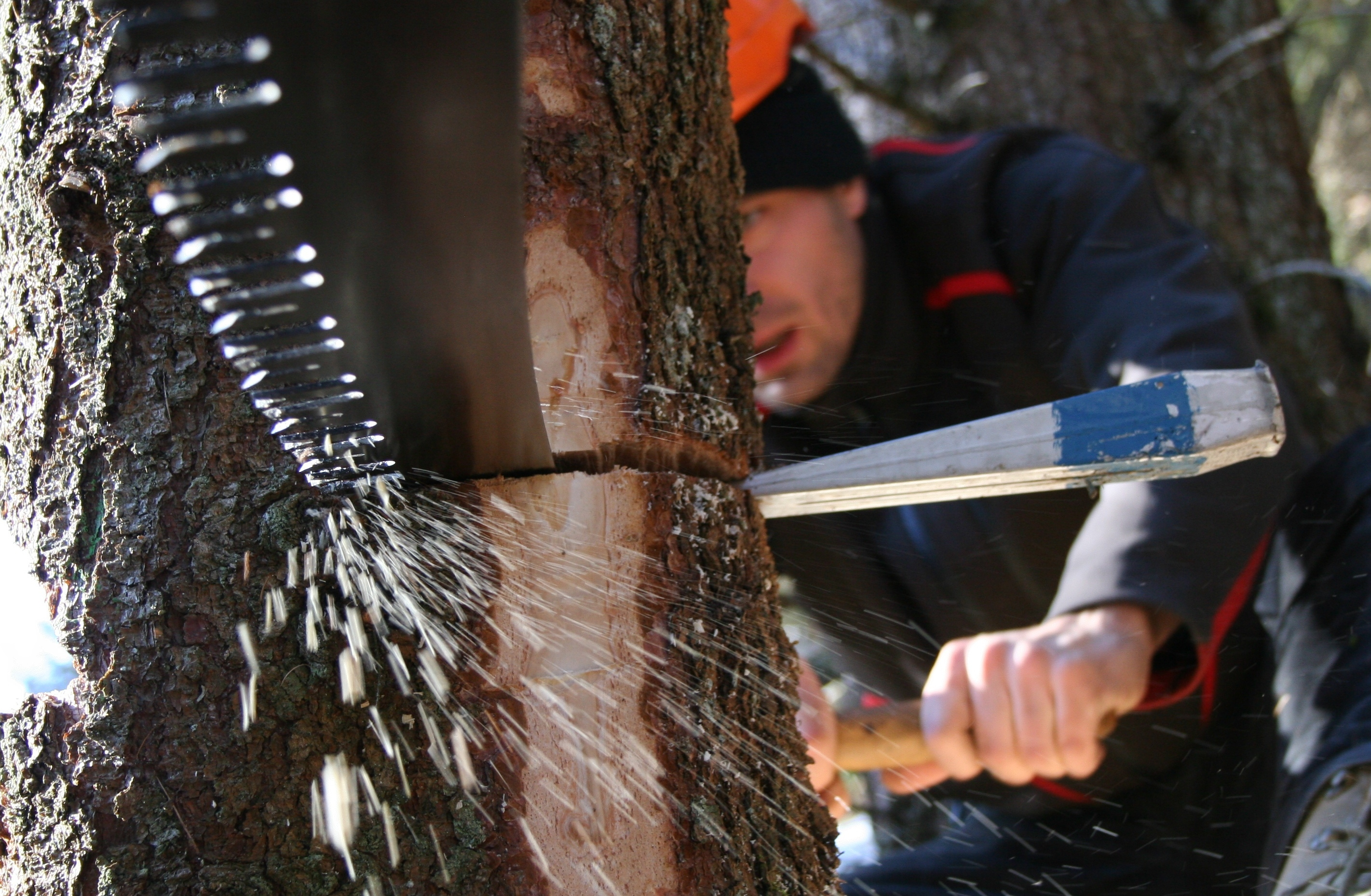
Hand logging

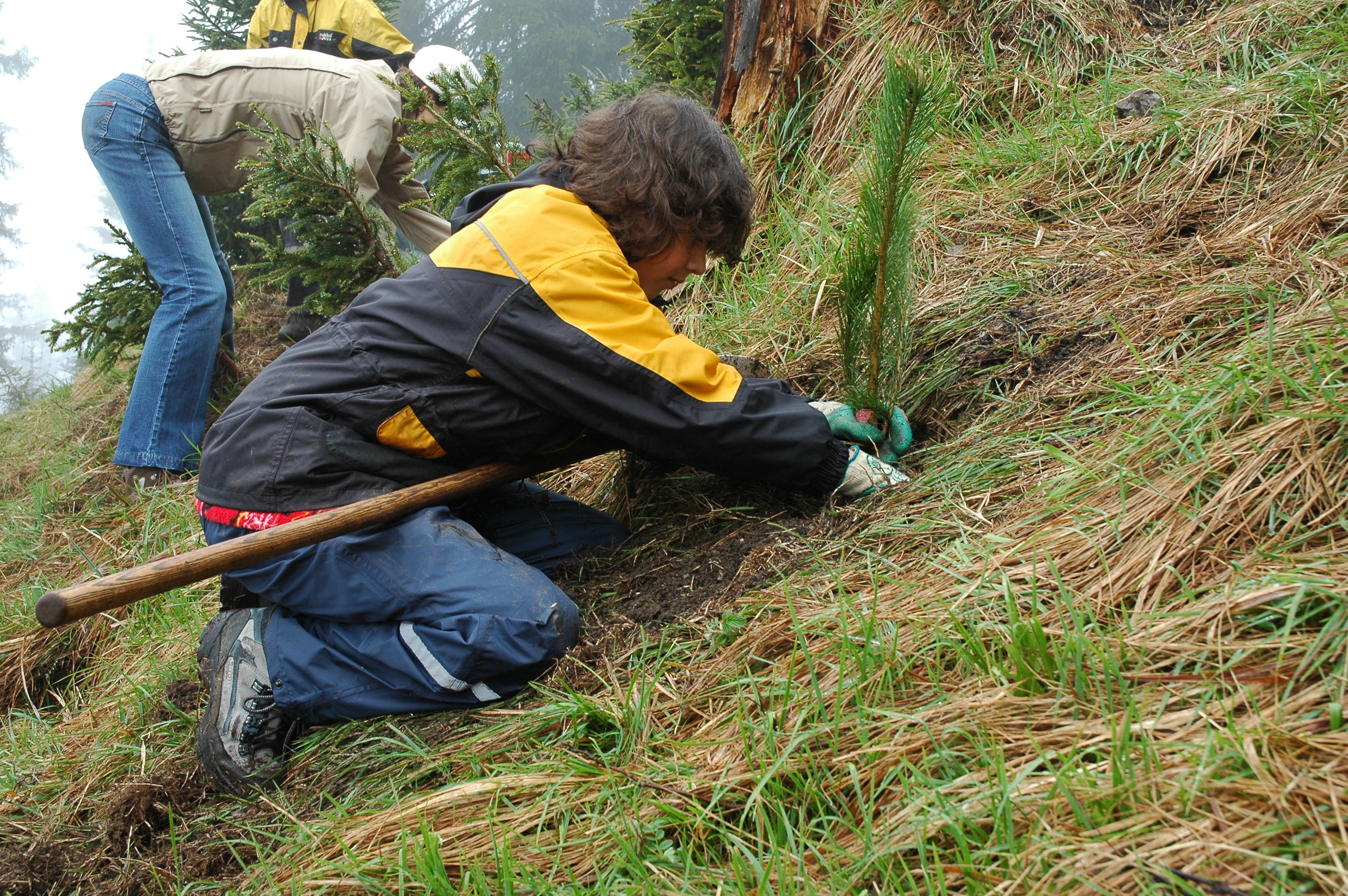
Planting

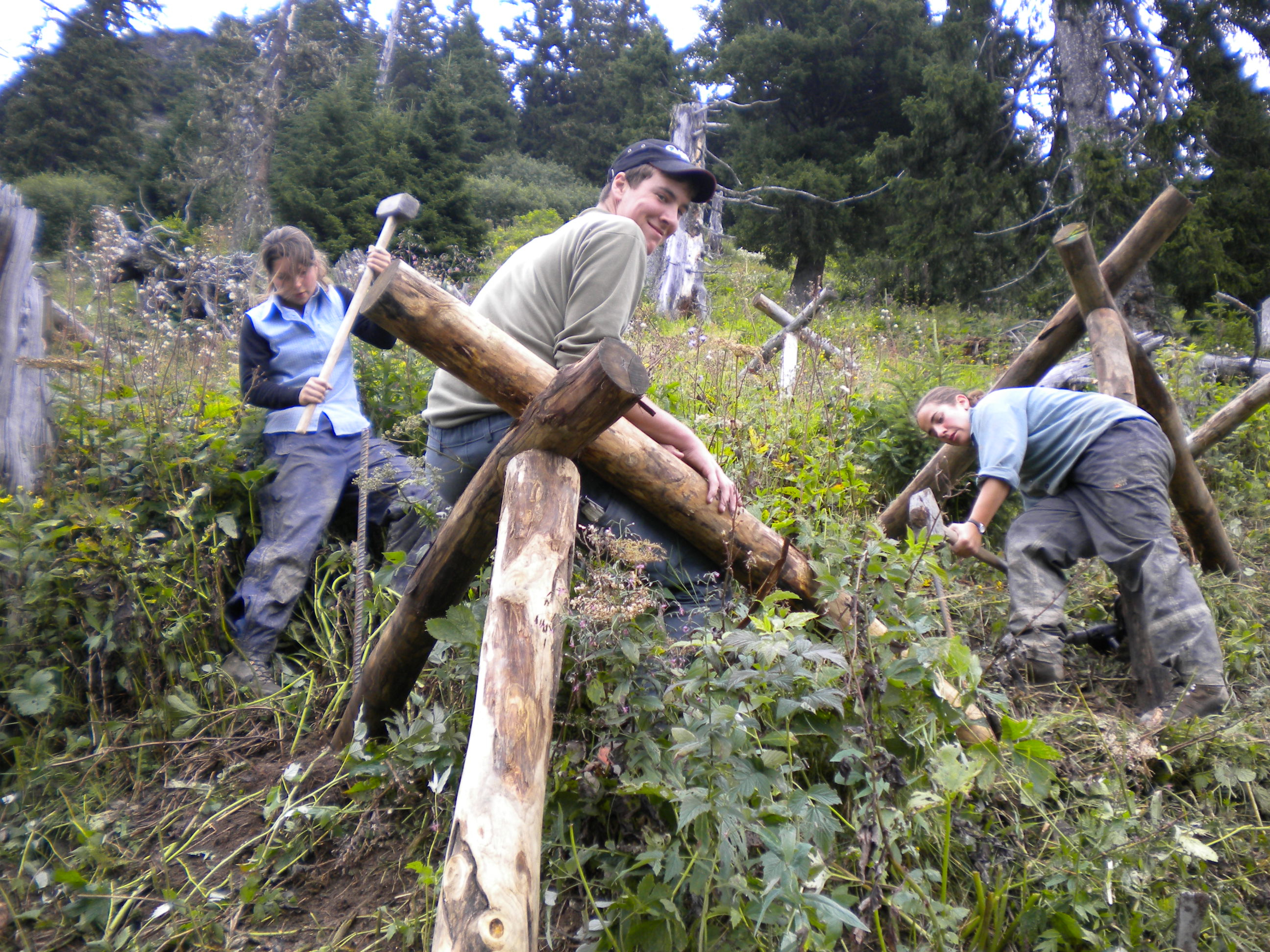
Tripods

== Media coverage ==
- Muddled Environmental Protection: The Hunsrück Moor Rescuers from the Bergwaldprojekt. Landesschau Rheinland-Pfalz, SWR 2024, 15 minutes.
