= Buller Conservation Group =

Environmental organisation in New Zealand

Buller Conservation Group is a registered incorporated society and an environmental organisation active on the West Coast of New Zealand.

The organisation was actively involved in supporting Native Forest Action's campaigns against Timberlands logging of native forest, and Solid Energy's pollution of the Waimangaroa River.

The organisation has been actively campaigning against the open cast mining of coal on Department of Conservation land. A key organiser of the group, Pete Lusk, stood down as spokesperson after harassment and threats from locals, culminating in a pipe bomb exploding in his letterbox.
