= Lesein Mutunkei =

Kenyan footballer and environmental activist

Lesein Mutunkei is a Kenyan environmental activist and footballer. Mutunkei "started his journey as an environmentalist when he was five years old". He founded Trees4Goals, an initiative to combat deforestation. He has been featured in multiple books and has participated in environmental conferences worldwide. In 2019, he attended the first UN Youth Climate Summit in New York City, United States, where at age fifteen he was one of the youngest attendees.

Mutunkei started playing tennis at the age of seven before starting to focus on playing football at the age of twelve and was regarded as one of his school team's most important strikers. He attended a pre-college program at United World College Maastricht in the Netherlands.
