= Mangrove Care Forum Bali =

Indonesian environmental organization

- Type: Social, Humanitarian, Environment, Philanthropic Organization
- Founded: Started in 2013
- Founder: Tomy Winata

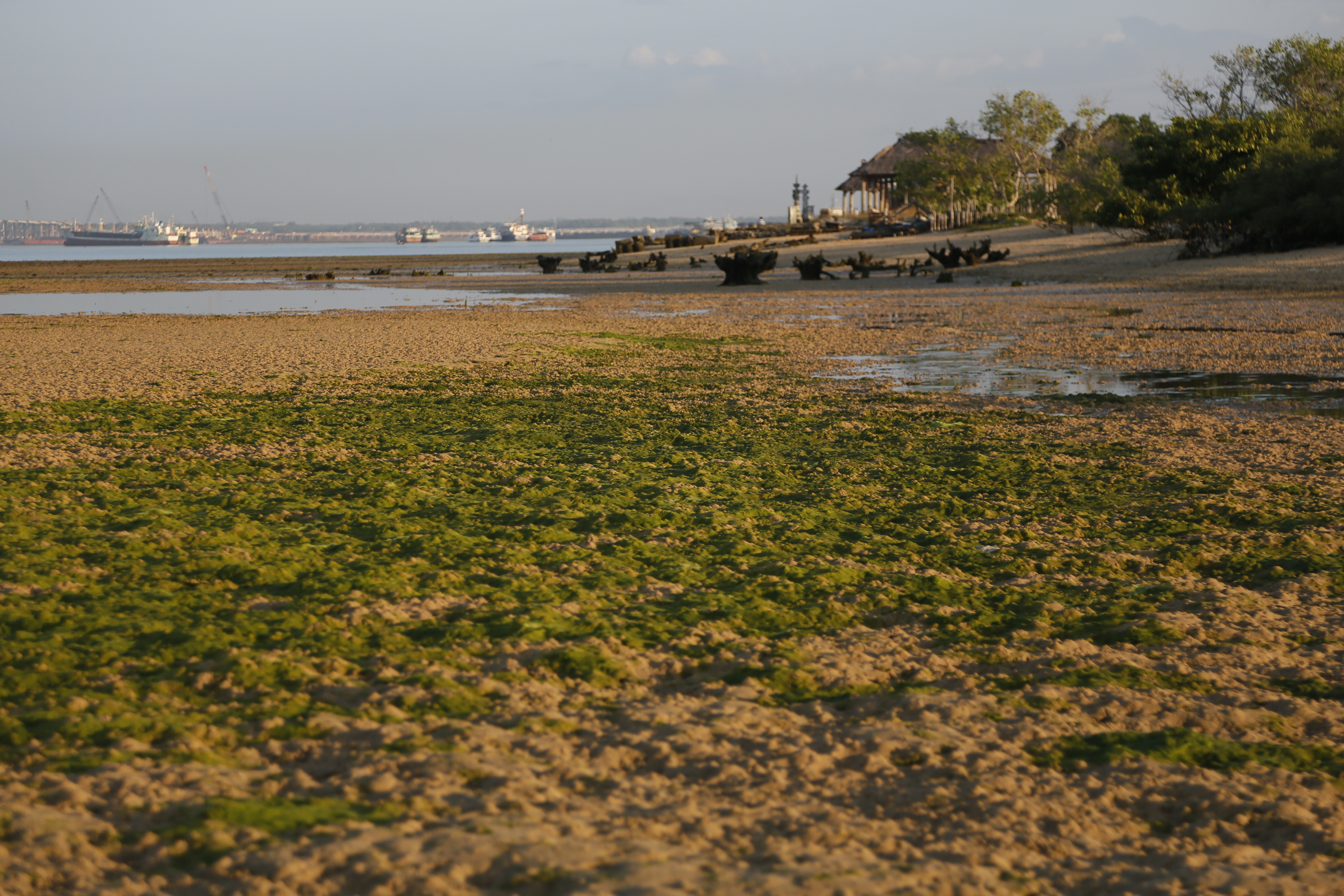
Bali mangrove low tide green land

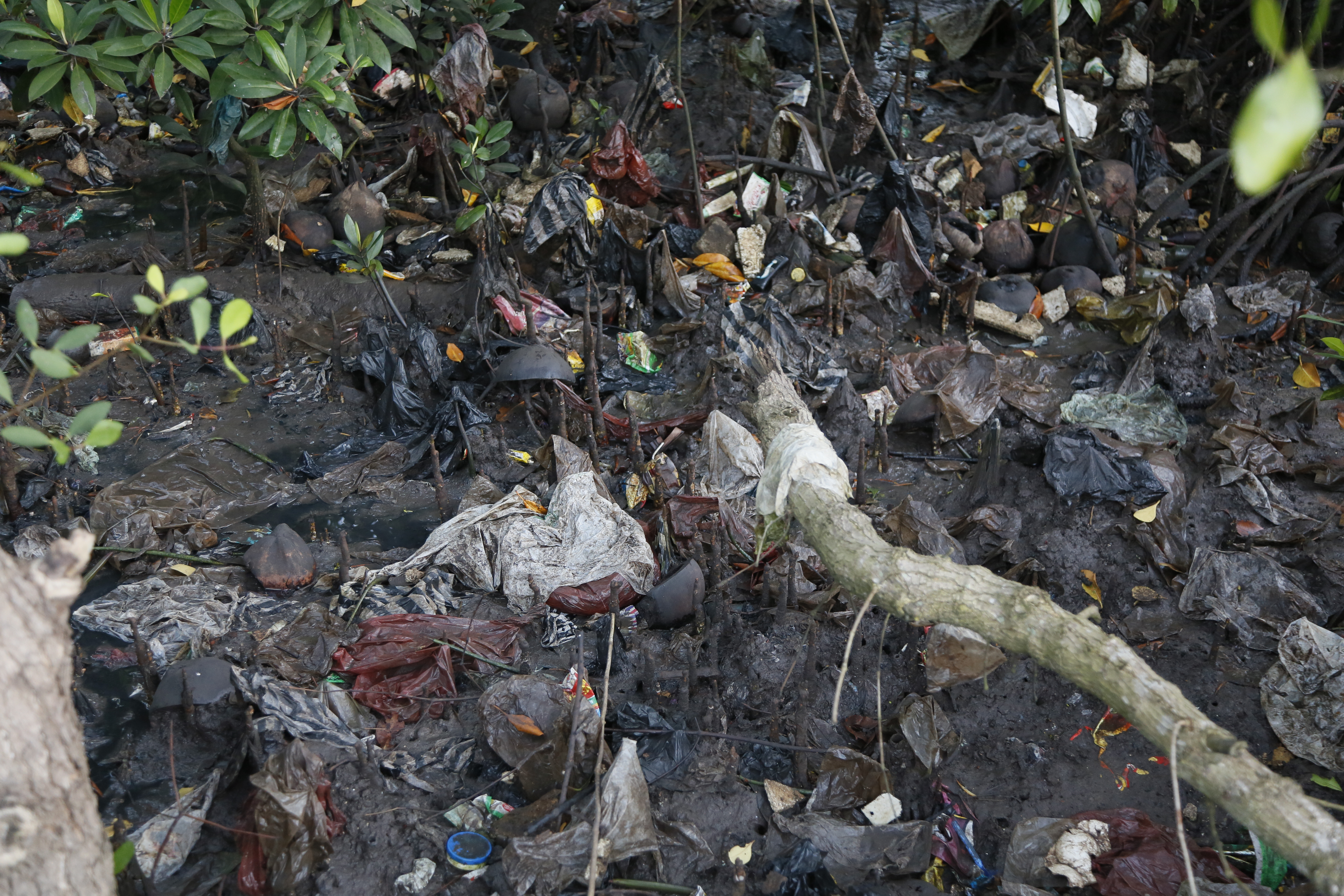
Display of dirty mangrove low tide

Mangrove Care Forum Bali (MCFB), also known as Forum Peduli Mangrove Bali (FPMB), is formed with the aim to protect, preserve, rehabilitate, replant and educate, as a concerted effort to save the mangroves. Supported by the Artha Graha Peduli Foundation, the team at the Mangrove Care Forum Bali draws from 16 years of experience the foundation has in caring for and operating the Tambling Wildlife Nature Conservation Park, located at South Bukit Barisan Selatan National Park, within 356,000 hectares of Tropical Rainforest and 21,600 hectares of Marine Nature Reserve.

The mangrove forest under the care of The Mangrove Care Forum Bali is located in the Ngurah Rai Grand Forest Park, a 1,373.5 hectare mangrove forest in the Benoa Bay Area in Bali. The mangrove forest suffers from severe pollution and misuse, & debris and rubbish from nearby villages. Deforestation of trees and littering its grounds are a common sight. The focus of the Mangrove Care Forum Bali is to involve the communities surrounding the mangrove and enlist regular help to clean up and create a safe environment for plants and marine life to thrive. A further goal is to prevent further abrasion of coastline and to regrow the affected areas to lush mangrove vegetation.

== About Mangrove Care Forum Bali ==
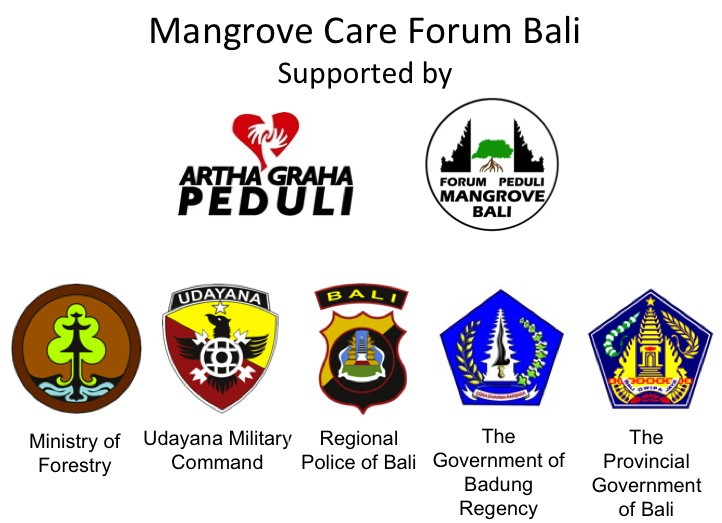
Partners of Mangrove Care Forum Bali

Initiated by Tomy Winata at the start of 2013, the Mangrove Care Forum Bali is established in partnership with:

- The Ministry of Forestry (Indonesia)
- The Ministry of Maritime (Indonesia) ok
- The Ministry of Environment (Indonesia)
- The Provincial Government of Bali
- The Government of Badung Regency
- Udayana Military Command
- Regional Police of Bali
- University of Udayana
- Artha Graha Care Foundation
- Nearby communities including LPM, Village Chief, Customary and Religious Leaders from 5 villages – Tanjung Benoa, Benoa, Jimbaran, Tuban and Kedonganan.

== Ambassador ==
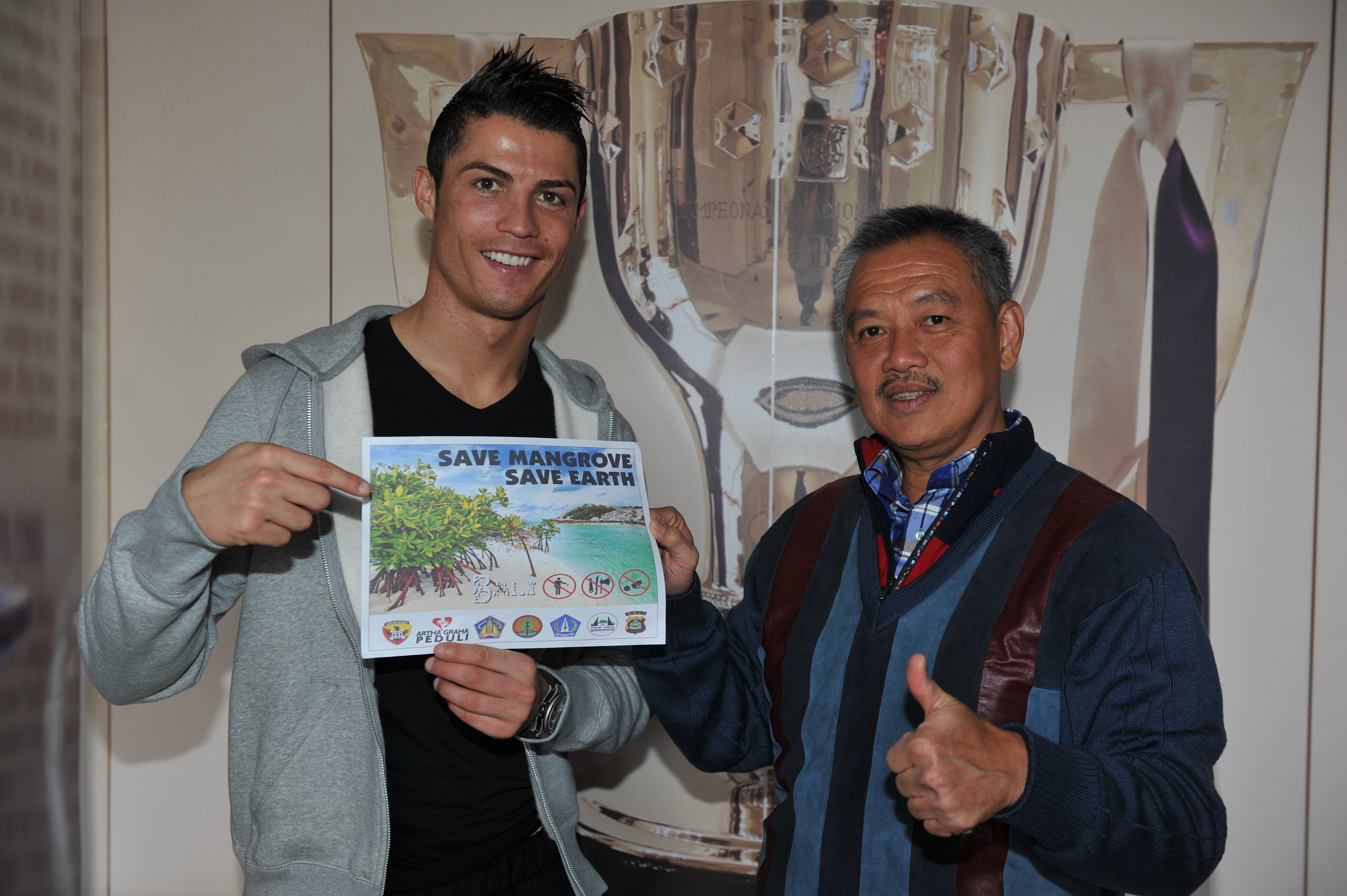
Mangrove Care Forum Bali Ambassador

Cristiano Ronaldo, the famous Portuguese footballer, has been appointed the ambassador for this movement to conserve mangrove by the Mangrove Care Forum Bali. He came on board because of the mangrove forests’ ability to help buffer against tsunamis, a cause he dearly supports after witnessing first-hand the devastation of the tsunamis when he visited Aceh after the 2004 tsunami. He met up with the 8-year-old boy who was found alive after 19 days at sea, dragged out by the unforgiving tsunami, wearing a Portuguese football jersey. Martunis survived on puddled water and dried noodles and was reunited with his father and grandfather. His story was later recounted in a book published by Radio 68H ‘Lolos dari Maut Tsunami’.

== Challenges and Aims ==
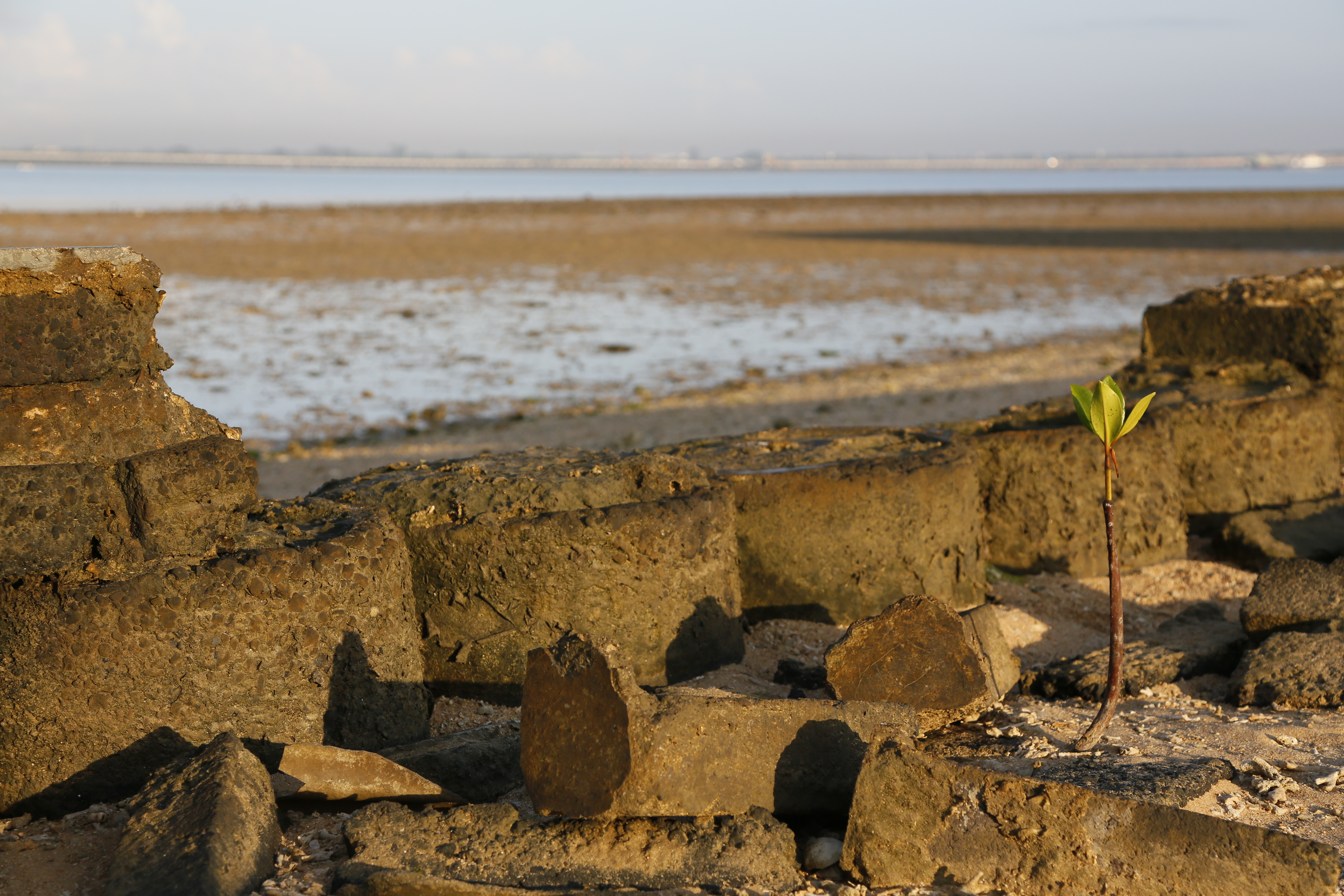
Scenery of Harapan

The Benoa Bay mangrove forest is both primary and secondary vegetation, meaning parts of it have never been cleared or removed while parts have regrown after the natural and human assisted destruction of the original vegetation. It suffered damage from pollution and construction projects. Mangrove forests can serve as a natural barrier to tidal erosions, and are oxygen providers and a safe haven to many species. The Mangrove Care Forum Bali helps to conserve and nurture life along this coastal sanctuary, and has set 5 key goals in furthering its efforts:

- Maintenance of Degraded Land
- Preservation of Mangrove Areas
- Replanting of Mangroves
- Rehabilitation of Degraded Mangroves
- Mangrove Development

== The Future of Mangrove Care Forum Bali ==
The Mangrove Care Forum Bali aims increase community awareness regarding the preservation of the Ngurah Rai Grand Forest Park in the long. Education plays a part and the Mangrove Care Forum Bali plans to start an Early Environment Education programme. This activity is targeted at students from elementary level to high school, and plans to reach out to communities around the Benoa Bay area. The methodology and materials of environment education will be adapted to local context (language, case studies and photos) and be part of the regular school curriculum. The Mangrove Care Forum Bali, in collaboration with Universities, Ministry of Forestry and experts in the conservation fields, will develop modules that can be incorporated and accepted by all levels of participants.

The programme to clean up the beaches had already started in March 2013 with daily activities involving students and the community at large, with the aim of reaching 1,373.5 hectares of mangrove in 5 villages in Benoa Bay.

== Introduction to the Indonesian Mangroves ==
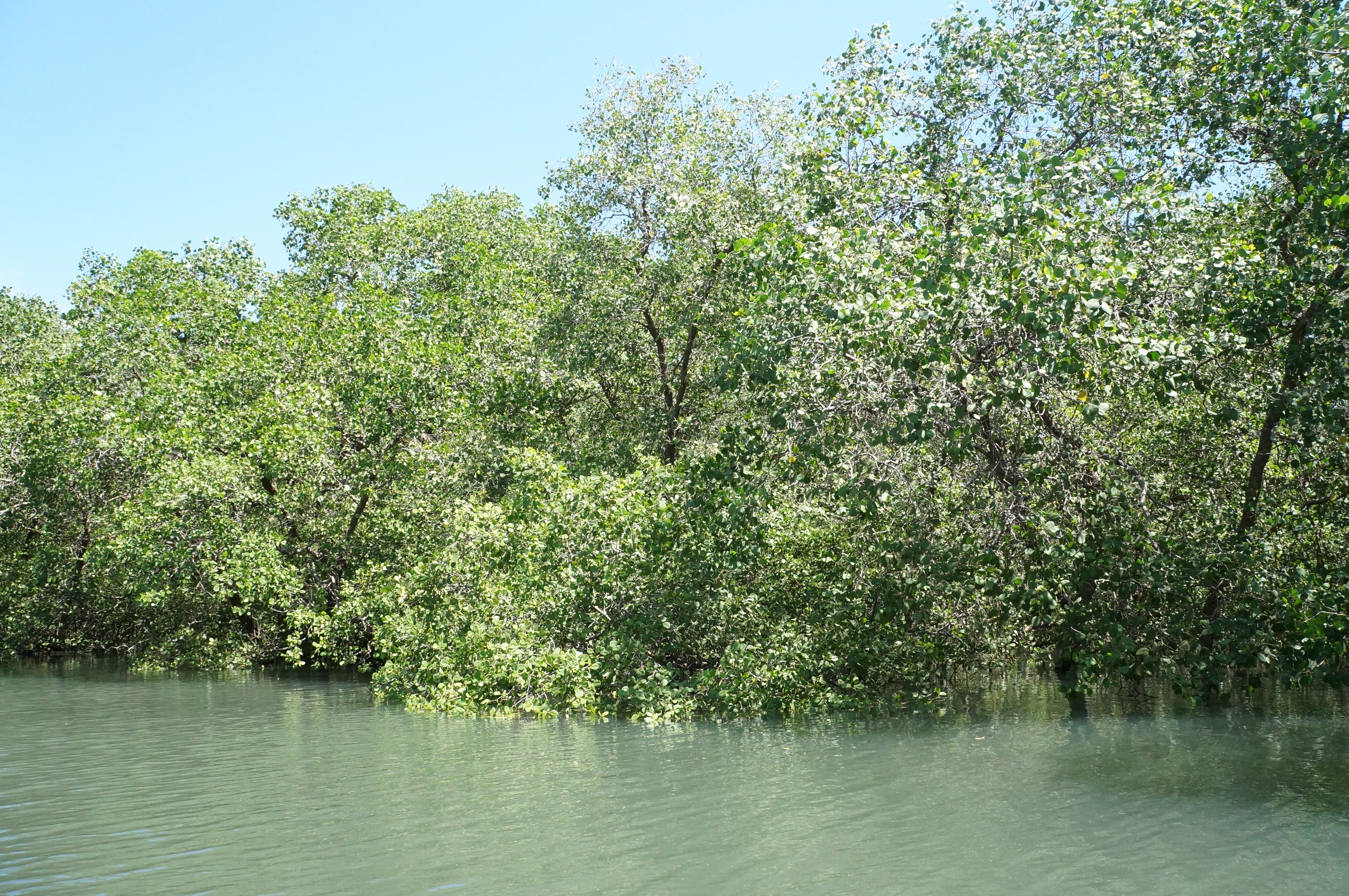
Overview of the mangrove in Bali

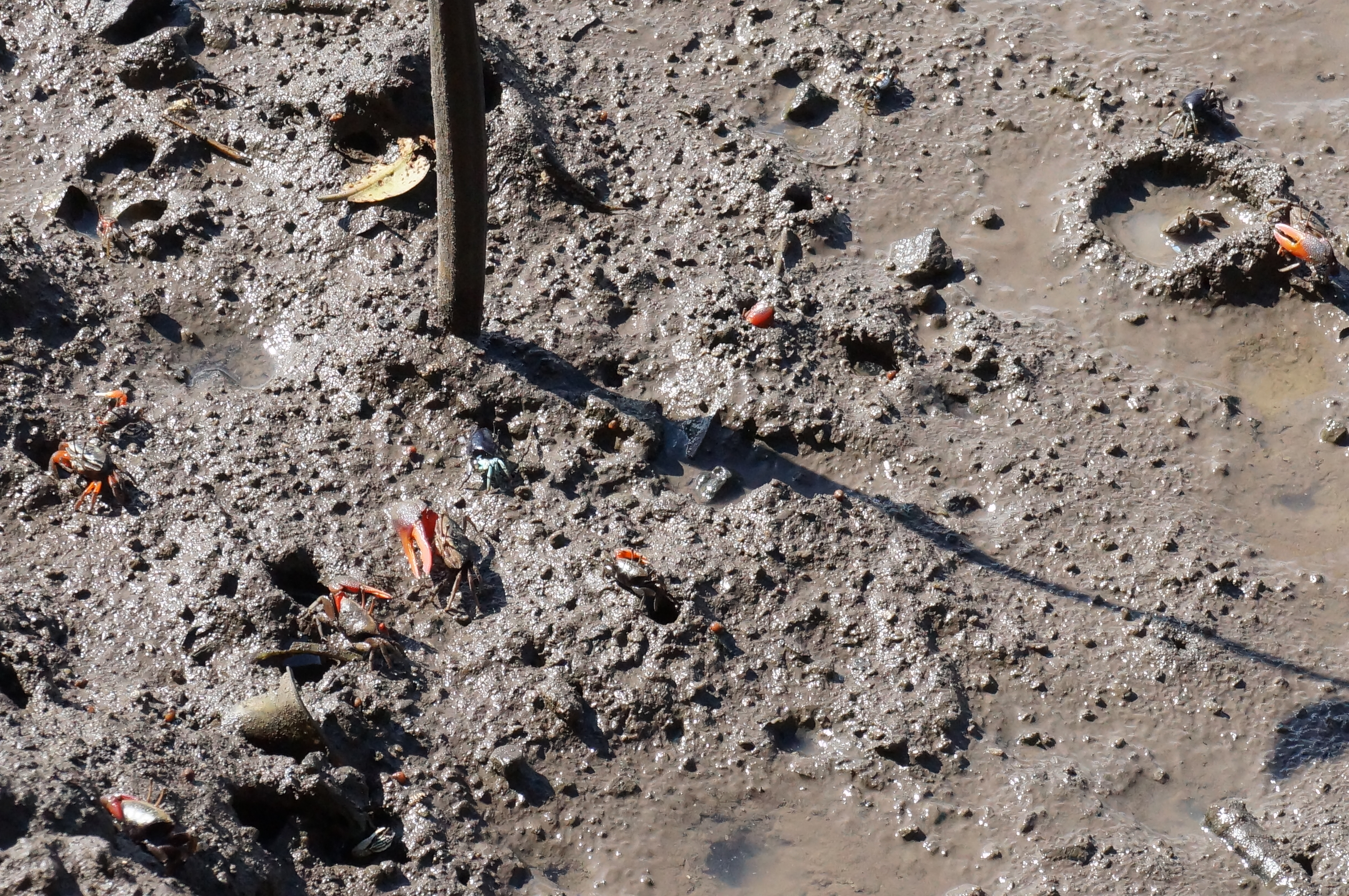
Mangrove crabs

Indonesia is an archipelagic country with more than 17,000 islands and 95,181 km of coastline, of which about 6,000 islands are inhabited by over 238 million people. In the 1980s, there are more than 4.2 million hectares of mangroves but half of that coverage has been lost by the end of the 1990s. For centuries, the Indonesian people have relied on the resources provided by the mangroves, for firewood, charcoal, tannin, dyes, food and beverages, medicine, pole and timber. In the early days of commercialization, fishing and charcoal production made the basic economic activities. Now, millions of hectares of mangrove forests are lost to agriculture, oil palm plantations and fish farms, making coastal communities vulnerable to the force of tropical storms and loss of livelihood and products.

In 2011, the Meteorology, Climatology and Geophysics Agency (BMKG) detected 23 tropical cyclones off the coast, which produced high speed winds, heavy rains, and storm surges that caused flooding and structural damage to buildings and coastal infrastructure. Mangroves are adjacent to major landmasses and big rivers in Indonesia, and mostly found on the coasts of large islands of Sumatra, Kalimantan, Sulawesi and Papua. The island of Java, where approximately 130 million people live, is particularly vulnerable to tropical storms.

In 2007, the Indonesian Forestry Ministry established 2 centres for mangrove development. During 2010 and 2011, the centre on the island of Bali planted 8,000 new mangrove trees, and the other centre, in the city of Medan on the island of Sumatra, put in 10,000 new plants. These efforts paled against the continual destruction of the coastal forests in the name of urban development, mainly for agricultural expansion. The realisation and urgency that we need to step up efforts in preserving the mangrove forests is what led to the formation of the Mangrove Care Forum Bali.

=== Ecology/Biology ===
The Ngurah Rai Grand Forest Park is a vast green area located in Benoa Bay. The coast is filled with diversity in nature’s ecosystem, including but not limited to:

- 66 species of Macrozoobenthos (Nassarius luridus, Clypeomorus coralium and Nerita antiquate)
- 45 species of Fish (Teraponidae, Belonidae, Muraenidae)
- 36 species of Birds (Accipitridae, Laridae)
- 27 species of Plankton (Skeletonema costatum, Podon)
- 16 species of Mangrove Trees (Ceriops tagal, Avicennia marina)
- 5 species of Reptiles (Komodo dragons, vipers, mamba)
- 3 species of Mammals (Brandocota indica, Pteropus edulis)

=== Importance to preserve and protect Benoa Bay ===
Benoa Bay is a tidal estuary located on the southeast coast of Bali. The estuary is protected by the narrow sandy Benoa Peninsula which protrudes northwards from the southern tip of the harbour and which closes off the entire southern portion of the estuary. Serangan Island which is located to the north partially closes the remainder of the estuary except for a one kilometre navigable stretch of water that separates the southern tip of the island from the Benoa Peninsula. The northern tip of the island is separated from the mainland at high and mid tides by a very shallow straight which is 400 metres at its narrowest point. The entire coastline is protected by an extensive coral reef system that runs continuously apart from a very narrow (200 metre) channel at the harbour entrance at the northern tip of the Benoa Peninsula.

The human feature of the Bay is the Benoa Port facility located on reclaimed land in the middle of the estuary, and the connecting causeway that stretches 3 kilometres north to the mainland. The causeway being a solid barrier has greatly affected the natural flushing of the bay by tide and stream discharge. Benoa Bay is lined with a mangrove forest that has suffered depletion due to development and land reclamation. Estimates are that 50% of the mangrove forest has been lost since 1980 as a result of development. There are many fresh water rivers flowing into the estuary, predominantly those draining the central plains and mountain ranges to the north, and to a lesser extent from the southern Bukit Plateau.

Benoa Bay suffers from a number of serious environmental problems and in a sense, similar to other estuarine environments, is a focal point for environmental impacts that originate elsewhere in the region. These problems range from eutrophication of the estuary due to nutrient loading through to biological pollution from untreated sewage effluent discharge.

Three of the fresh water rivers that enter Benoa Bay from the north originate in the agricultural heartland of Bali and reach the estuary after travelling through the highly populated urban centre of Denpasar. Agricultural runoff is particularly high in nutrients from fertilisers and manure from farm animals. In particular crop applications of urea, triple super phosphate and potassium chloride, as well as growth stimulant ZA are common in the catchment area. Fertilisers that are not directly absorbed in the rice fields are carried down through the irrigation system and eventually through rivers and out into the bay. All of the rivers entering the bay have large quantities of excess nutrients and the nutrient loading of the bay is evident with the visible growth of algae and uncharacteristic sea bed grasses.
