= WWF Guianas =

WWF (World Wildlife Fund) Guianas is an international conservation NGO, part of the WWF global network.

== Mission and objectives ==
WWF's main mission is "to stop the degradation of the planet's natural environment and to build a future in which humans live in harmony with nature." The regional office of WWF Guianas is also involved in a plurality of site specific objectives, often in partnership with civil society organizations and government institutions such as Conservation International and Iwokrama International Centre for Rain Forest Conservation and Development. These range from the protection and management of ecological landscapes, to educational and awareness campaigns on climate change, biodiversity and conservation.

== Notable programs and initiatives ==
- Earth Hour
- Protected Areas and Sound Land use Planning
- Payment for Ecosystem Services
- Gold Mining Pollution Abatement
- Marine Turtle Conservation
- Sustainable fisheries

== The Guianas' conservation significance ==
The three Guianas (Guyana, Suriname and French Guiana) have between 80 and 98% pristine forest cover and are part of the complex ecosystem of The Guiana Shield freshwater ecoregion, which provides 15% of the world's freshwater reserves. The forests, wetlands, savannah, waters and biodiversity make the Guiana Shield "essential to enriching and replenishing the world's biodiversity and, consequently, essential to the planet's survival" as Brigadier David Granger - President of the Cooperative Republic of Guyana pointed out during his speech at the Opening Ceremony of the IVth International Congress on Biodiversity of the Guiana Shield. It is also the home of incredible wildlife creatures such as jaguars, anteaters, anacondas, caimans, bats, and sea turtles. A phenomenal variety of fishes populate its waters, and a prodigious amount of different bird species inhabits its trees and skies. The coasts of the Guianas are home to one of the largest populations of the endangered leatherback turtle in the world and hosts millions of migratory birds from North America. Typical Guiana birds include the red ibis and the cock-of-the-rock. Multiple Indigenous communities live in key parts of the Shield such as the Iwokrama Forest or the Rupununi region.

== Offices and staff ==
The regional office of WWF Guianas is located in Paramaribo, Suriname. Country offices are also located in Georgetown, Guyana, and Cayenne, French Guiana. Laurent Kelle is the WWF French Guiana Country Office.
