= Friends of Snakes Society =

Indian snake conservation organisation

- Abbreviation: FOS
- Formation: 1995
- Founder: Rajkumar Kanuri
- Type: Non-governmental organisation
- Headquarters: Hyderabad, Telangana, India
- Region served: India (awareness programmes); Telangana and Andhra Pradesh (rescue and wildlife protection)
- Website: friendsofsnakes.org.in

Friends of Snakes Society (FOS) is a volunteer-based non-governmental organisation based in Hyderabad, Telangana, India, working in snake conservation, rescue and public education. Founded by Rajkumar Kanuri and formally registered in 1995, the society operates a round-the-clock rescue helpline and works with forest departments on reptile protection. Its awareness and snakebite education programmes extend across India.

FOS reported more than 75,000 snake rescues over the decade ending in 2024 and a further 15,265 across Telangana in 2025. Its work also includes rehabilitation, professional training and assistance with anti-poaching operations. Researchers affiliated with the society have published studies on snake distribution, urban ecology and venom composition.

== History ==
FOS developed from snake conservation activities initiated by Rajkumar Kanuri and a group of volunteers in Sainikpuri in the late 1980s. The group began conducting awareness programmes in the early 1990s and formally registered the society in 1995. Initially concentrated in Secunderabad, its activities subsequently expanded to other parts of Telangana. The organisation marked its thirtieth anniversary in June 2025.

== Rescue and rehabilitation ==
FOS operates a round-the-clock helpline to coordinate responses to snakes encountered in homes and other human-occupied areas. The society reports a volunteer network of more than 150 people.

FOS collaborated with the Telangana Forest Department to establish a snake rescue centre at Bowrampet, Hyderabad, which opened on 5 June 2020. The centre accommodates rescued snakes until they are fit for relocation.

In January 2025, the society reported more than 75,000 snake rescues over the preceding decade, with annual totals rising from 3,389 in 2015 to 13,028 in 2024. For 2025, FOS reported 15,265 snakes rescued across Telangana. Its records indicated that approximately 55.6 per cent were venomous species, with many rescues occurring in Hyderabad's urban and peri-urban areas.

In its 2026 account of rescue operations, FOS describes a coordination system using interactive voice response call routing and an internal application for dispatch, recording species and locations, and identifying duplicate reports. The society also states that snake-related calls from Telangana's 112 emergency service are referred to its helpline.

== Awareness and training ==
FOS conducts snake awareness and snakebite education programmes across India. Its sessions cover snake ecology, safety during encounters, snakebite first aid and misconceptions about snakes. In the first six months of 2025, the society conducted more than 200 sessions in educational institutions, forest and police academies, and rural communities, reaching more than 40,000 people, according to The Times of India.

FOS's educational activities include training in reptile handling and captive care. According to the society, these comprise a six-month volunteer training programme, herpetology teaching in collaboration with the Forest College and Research Institute, and workshops for forest personnel and zookeepers.

== Recent research ==
=== Species distribution and natural history ===
In 2022, FOS researchers published an annotated checklist of Telangana's snakes in Reptiles & Amphibians. The study used rescue records collected between 1995 and 2020, together with observations of distribution and natural history. It documented 41 species belonging to 11 families.

Earlier work by FOS-affiliated researchers included a 2018 study of the phylogeny and conservation status of the Indian egg-eating snake.

=== Urban snake ecology ===
In 2026, researchers from FOS and collaborating institutions, including the Centre for Cellular and Molecular Biology, published a study of Hyderabad's snake encounters in Global Ecology and Conservation. It analysed 55,467 snake rescue records from 2013 to 2022, examining seasonal and daily patterns, weather relationships and the spatial distribution of encounters. The study found that spectacled cobras and Indian rat snakes accounted for approximately 76 per cent of rescues. Rescue activity was highest between July and November, peaking in October, and encounter hotspots were concentrated in expanding peripheral areas of the city.

=== Venom research ===
A 2026 study in Biochimie, co-authored by a FOS-affiliated researcher and collaborators from the Centre for Cellular and Molecular Biology, Bangor University and other institutions, examined venom composition in 19 snakes belonging to five krait species. Using proteomics, it compared variation within and between species and investigated the influence of geographic distance and evolutionary relationships on venom composition.

== Snakebite prevention ==
In 2025, FOS announced a Snakebite Mitigation Initiative focused on Telangana and Andhra Pradesh. The announcement included plans for the website snakebite.in, with snake identification support, first-aid information, a venomous-snake distribution map and a hospital locator.

== Anti-poaching and wildlife protection ==
FOS assists forest departments in recovering reptiles from illegal capture and trade, including snakes held by snake charmers and monitor lizards offered for sale. Its work also includes public education intended to reduce demand for captured snakes. In 2016, the society worked with the Telangana Forest Department, Humane Society International/India and other organisations on outreach about the capture and display of live snakes during Naga Panchami.

In July 2019, FOS and a Forest Department task force recovered 75 Bengal monitor lizards from a fish market in Machilipatnam, Andhra Pradesh, where the animals were being offered for sale. The healthy reptiles were subsequently released in the Kondapalli reserve forest.

In August 2026, around 25 FOS members assisted Telangana Forest Department teams with checks at temples, markets and transport hubs ahead of Naga Panchami. The operation covered Hyderabad, Rangareddy and Sangareddy districts and recovered 17 cobras held by snake charmers, according to a report published on 17 August.
