= Eaternity =

Swiss climate organization

Eaternity is a research and climate organization headquartered in Zürich, Switzerland. Their female founder Judith Ellens was awarded digital shapers 2022.

Eaternity has a focus on establishing a climate-friendly diet, which according to the Planetary health diet and the Intergovernmental Panel on Climate Change is a necessity to stay within a 1.5° target. For this purpose, Eaternity provides public and free access to the carbon footprints of food products with a calculator and a poster, each referencing the Global warming potential of more than 500 raw food products in CO_{2}eq against the benchmark of our societal food consumption. The climate impact is calculated with a Scope3 life-cycle assessment, including rainforest deforestation, methane emissions from ruminants, production, processing, packaging, transport, and preservation.

They have published CO_{2} calculations of more than 50'000 food retail products together with the Codecheck App and advocate for CO_{2} labeling of food.

With Eaternity's eco-label food companies profile the environmental footprint on their products' packaging visible in more than 10'000 retail markets across Europe. The label includes indicators for climate, water, animal welfare, and rainforest deforestation.
