= Kano State Environmental Planning and Protection Agency =

The Kano State Environmental Planning and Protection Agency (KASEPPA) government agency in Kano State, Nigeria that is responsible for issues concerning the environment in the state. It is the first state level promulgation of environmental law in Nigeria, which was established by the state Edict No.15 of 1990 before it metamorphosed into the Kano State Urban Planning and Development Authority (KNUPDA) in 1990 (KANUPDA, 2022).

Functions include planning urban centers, control of development in urban centers, provision of amenities, conveniences and infrastructures, pollution control and abatement, and other functions necessary for healthy and orderly urban growth. KASEPPA is responsible for ensuring that public land is not illegally allocated to individuals, and destroys illegally constructed buildings. The agency has called on traditional rulers in the state for assistance in achieving this goal. The agency has required GSM mobile phone operators to relocate Base transceiver stations that were commissioned without permission. KASSEPA is also responsible for supervising road and drainage rehabilitation and construction.

In a controversial decision, in July 2001 KASEPPA demolished twenty church buildings in Kano city on the basis that they failed to comply with environmental laws.

The agency supports entrepreneurs who wish to construct and operate public toilets. KASEPPA allocates the site on which the toilets are to be built, provides building plans and supervises construction. The agency also provides and reinforces hygiene guidelines. The agency has fixed standards for building designs and site selection. The objective is to safeguard ground water from pollution and ensure a healthy environment. The agency assists in ensuring that urban waste from these toilets and other sources is put to good use by farmers, particularly in the vicinity of Kano city.
