= Göncöl Foundation =

Hungarian environmental organisation

Göncöl Alapítvány
- Founded: 1989; Vác, Hungary
- Type: Foundation
- Purpose: Environmentalism
- Region served: Hungarywide
- Key people: Vilmos Kiszel, President
- Website: goncol.hu

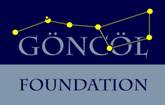
Logo of the Göncöl Foundation

The Göncöl Foundation (Hungarian: Göncöl Alapítvány) is the Hungarian environmental organisation, seated in the Göncöl House in Vác, Hungary. The Foundation, created in his present form in 1989, is a not-for-profit, non-partisan organisation independent of any political or commercial interest. It is the core of a structured, not-for-profit Alliance of legal bodies, individuals, NGOs, volunteers and experts. The Foundation is winner of the Hungarian Pro Natura Price (1993), an award on nature conservation.

The Foundation is member of international organisations, e.g. the International Union for Conservation of Nature (IUCN). The Göncöl house is also hosting the Hungarian National Committee for IUCN.

== History and objectives ==
Göncöl started in Vác as a science youth group in 1973. The students who returned to the club year after year continued to initiate new fields of activity. This is how Göncöl evolved to become what it is today: an autonomous structure of environmental and social organisations and programs.

In its present form, it was created in 1989 for supporting Göncöl type organisations established since the 1970s. Today's duty of the Foundation is to provide assistance in order to fulfil its common mission shared with the Göncöl Alliance to preserve and engender nature, social and human values, and to transform society to a more sustainable as it is now, to one based on the co-operation of small, human sized communities.

The Foundation had significant role during democratic transition, for instance in formulating and debating the Environment Act, in introducing a system of governmental assistance for the civil sector, in the Danube movement, in environmental field inventories, in the declaration of nature protection statuses and in cross-sector co-operations.

== Work ==
The Göncöl Foundation has five different units: The Environment and Sustainability Education Centre, the Regional Studies Institute, the Editorial and Publishing Office, the "Look-out" Modern Arts Gallery and the Public Assistance Workgroup.

The Environment and Sustainability Education Centre started in 1987. It is seated in the Göncöl House in Vác and has a field centre in the Bakony-mountains. It assists a network of five other field centres, all of them members of the Hungarian Association of Environment Education Centres, where traditionally Göncöl gives the operating wise-chair. Basic principle of Göncöl education system is progressive education meaning sustainability education by active field education and training through humanistic, personal caring. Further elements of the education system are three nature trails, a library, the "Precious Stones of Gaia" Natural History Museum, field camps, accredited and other education and training courses, publication of field manuals and textbooks etc. The Group develops contacts with schools and other education institutions and organises different kind of environmental education programmes (e.g. guided walks on nature trails, special practical classes on waste, nature conservation, responsible shopping, herbs etc., activity programmes on international and national environmental dates, craft workshops with natural materials and so on).

The Regional Studies Institute is also located in Vác, established in 2000 after several successful projects. The Institute comprises two branches, field research (ecology, environment and nature conservation) and integral planning with public participation (economy and social data, analysis, conflict management, environment and spatial planning). The Institute is applying GIS.

Most successful accomplishments of the Institute are researches that preceded the creation of the Danube-Ipoly National Park (1992–1996) in 36 volumes, chairing and operating the Reconciliation Committee for the Law of the Environment of Hungary (1990–1995) passed as Law LIII of 1995 on General Rules of Protection of the Environment, and the Integral Management Plan of the Main Water Reserves of Budapest (1997–1999) passed by the Environment Commission of the Parliament as Res.2/1999.

The Editorial and Publishing Office is located in Budapest, established in 1986. The Foundation together with the Budapest Zoo & Botanical Garden (Hungarian: Fővárosi Állat- és Növénykert) publishes two bimonthly, nationally distributed, full colour, 52 pages nature science magazines. Süni (English: hedgehog) is primarily for kids and teenagers, and Vadon (English: "wildlife") for adults. Besides, Göncöl publishes other regular periodicals, as well as books, newsletters, booklets, brochures, etc. and contributes to national students’ science competitions, holds open days, and provides training for teachers.

The "Look-out" Modern Arts Gallery, located on the Margaret Island (Hungarian: Margit-sziget) in Budapest, started in 1984. Host of the Gallery is the ancient water-tower, a protected monument, also known for its round panorama on Budapest. The Gallery provides exhibition and performance place for contemporary arts, fine arts and events. Priorities are cross-arts and environment related painting, photo and sculpture exhibitions, events and guided tours for kids and adults. Annually opening is 1 May.

The Public Assistance Workgroup, situated in Vác, was established in 1989. It provides legal, administrative and clearinghouse assistance for social organisations and broad scale assistance for member organisations of the Göncöl Alliance. It co-founded several Hungarian national groups, and several networks concerned with environmental education, air pollution, waste management, and transport.
