= SOS Sahel Ethiopia =

SOS Sahel Ethiopia is an Ethiopian Non Governmental Organization (NGO) focusing on environmental sustainability and agriculture.

It formerly operated under the direction of SOS Sahel UK from 1989 until 2005, when it evolved into an independent national NGO recognized by the Ethiopian Ministry of Justice. SOS Sahel Ethiopia and SOS Sahel UK still operate in partnership in matters of private donor funding.

SOS Sahel Ethiopia works in three regions of Ethiopia: the Southern Nations, Nationalities, and People's, Oromia and Amhara regions. As of 2011, SOS Sahel Ethiopia was implementing a total of 7 projects in Ethiopia. Its headquarters is in Addis Ababa.

SOS Sahel Ethiopia implements projects which reverse environmental degradation and ensure environmental sustainability, reduce food insecurity, build the capacity of local community institutions comprising smallholder farmers and pastoralists, and improve those institutions’ access to fair and sustainable markets.

SOS Sahel Ethiopia also provides emergency assistance when humanitarian crises occur, such as in the Borena Zone of Ethiopia in 2010, when a severe drought threatened the lives of local pastoralists and their cattle.
