= Wildlife Watch Australia =

Wildlife Watch Australia is a non-profit organisation in Australia established in 2008 by Glenn Allen, the organisation leader and public relations officer.

Wildlife Watch Australia's main goal is to raise funds for the purchase of land in regional and outback regions throughout Australia for restoration and conservation. The conservation areas are used as housing for wildlife already living on the land, as a new home for relocated wildlife and a location for planting trees.
