= Gluaiseacht =

Irish organization

Logo of Gluaiseacht for Global Justice

Gluaiseacht for Global Justice is an Irish environmental, peace and social justice group. Gluaiseacht (Irish pronunciation: [ˈɡl̪ˠuəʃəxt̪ˠ]) means "movement" in the Irish language. The group believes in non-violent resistance to the current form of capitalist globalisation. It was originally a network of Ecological and One World Societies at universities and colleges throughout Ireland. It is a member of the Irish Environmental Network.

Gluaiseacht has been involved in anti-nuclear protests at the Trident submarine base in Faslane, Scotland, and the Sellafield nuclear plant.

Gluaiseacht organised the 2002 Ecotopia gathering (an annual summer camp for activists in Europe) in association with European Youth For Action.

== See also ==
- Conservation movement
- Environmentalism
