= EarthLink e.V. =

- EarthLink logo.
- Formation: 1998
- Founder: Bernhard Henselmann
- Founded at: Munich, Germany
- Type: e.V.
- Purpose: Fighting for human rights and the environment

EarthLink is an international organisation fighting for human rights and the environment, established in Munich, Germany in 1998. With partners around the globe, EarthLink is actively involved in the pursuit of a common cause—harmony between people and nature. Together with the local population, EarthLink designs strategies and measures to protect the environment and to further environmentally conscious development of the people's living spaces. To have locals participate in project work is an integral aspect for any long-term success.

EarthLink together with its partners is involved in concrete projects to protect forests, oceans and coastal areas. Through environmental education for children and youth as well as adults and current decision makers from the political and business sector, EarthLink lays the foundation for ecologically sustainable development. Practically oriented ways for a future that is worth living in are shown through forest camp-outs, joint reforestation programmes, seminars and workshops.

Currently, EarthLink e.V. is campaigning against child labour.

== History ==
EarthLink e.V. was founded in Munich, Germany in 1998 by Bernhard Henselmann, initially to take over the Projects for Protection of Rainforests in South America, Africa and Asia, following the disbanding of the organization Artists For Nature.

From 1998 to 1999, EarthLink e.V. took part in the Slate Creek Preserve project. The aim of this project was to develop a management program for the conservation of the habitats around Slate Creek, Belize, through active protection from illegal felling, illegal hunting and fire damage.

From 1998 to 1999, the NGO participated to the project for "Environmental education and its practice conversion by beekeeping with small farmers in Serra das Andorinhas, Brazil". The project was successful in several ways. The farmers are now capable to do the beekeeping by themselves and thus have an ecologically compatible source of income. Consequently, deforestation diminished visibly.

From 2000 to 2003, EarthLink started an information campaign named "ThinkShrimp". The goal of this campaign was to raise the awareness of people regarding shrimp farming practices and their negative environmental and social consequences, such as the destruction of mangroves and bad working conditions for the people working in the shrimp industry, especially in Asia and Latin America.

Since 2003, EarthLink e.V. is running an information campaign on child labour. The campaign officially started on 20 September, during the World Children's Day. The main purpose of this campaign is to raise the general awareness to this theme. To achieve this goal, EarthLink is primarily working on a database.

== See also ==
- International Labour Organization
