= Save Cambodia's Wildlife =

Cambodian non-government organization

Save Cambodia's Wildlife (SCW)
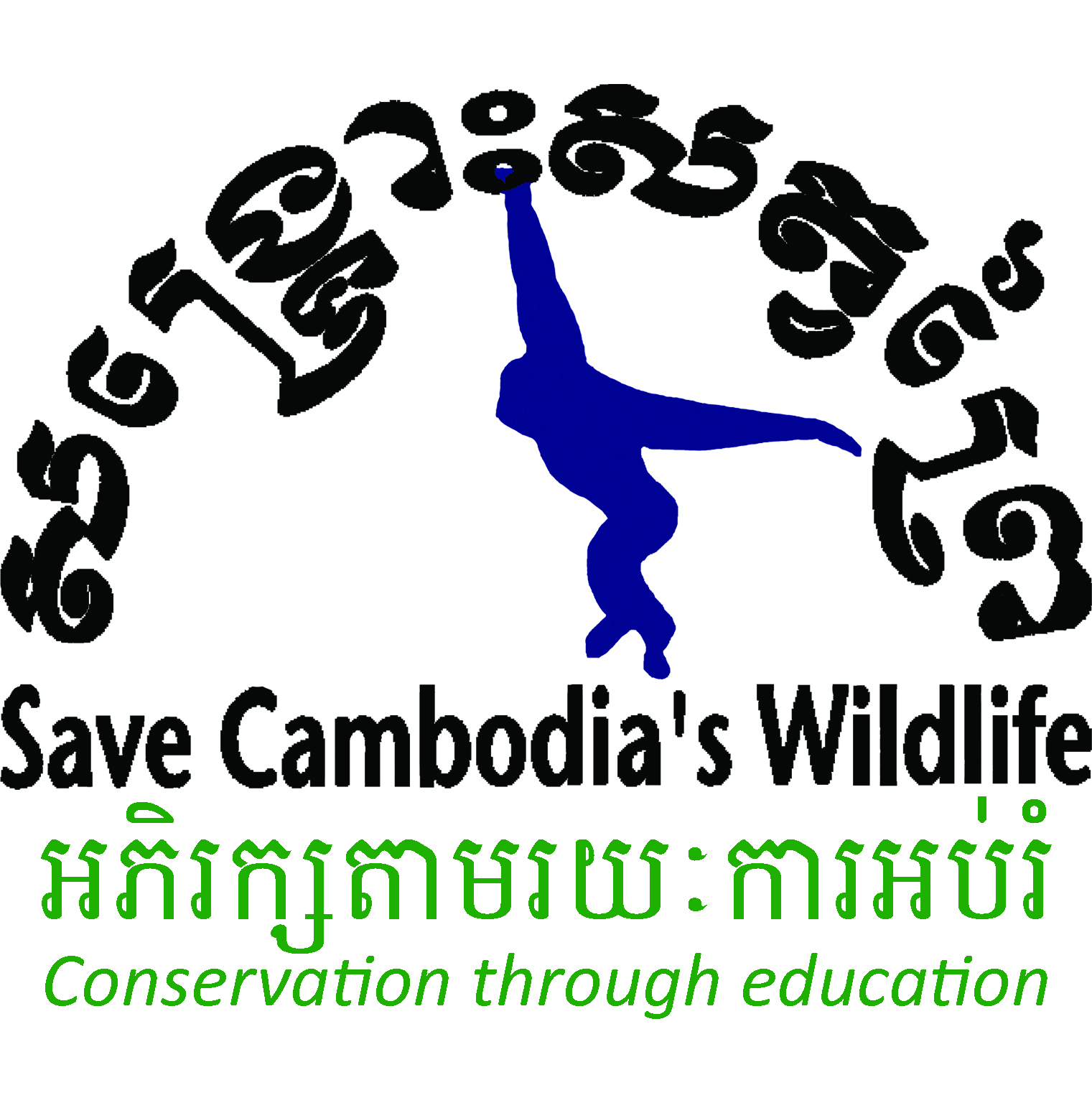
- Founded: 2002
- Type: Cambodian Non-governmental Organization
- Purpose: Environmental Conservation
- Location: Phnom Penh, Cambodia
- Key people: TEP Boonny, Executive Director
- Website: cambodiaswildlife.org

Save Cambodia's Wildlife (SCW), founded in 1999 and registered in 2002, is a national NGO (non-government organization) working for the protection and conservation of natural resources and wildlife habitats throughout Cambodia. The organization aims to raise awareness on climate change, wildlife protection and environmental issues in general. SCW has its head office in Phnom Penh and operates with three field offices in Banlung (Ratanakiri), Kratie (Kratie) and Siem Pang (Stung Treng).

The work approach is "Conservation through Education" as means of empowerment and change, using book publications, teaching programs and awareness campaigns to reach all levels of society. As of 2019, the NGO has supported fifteen projects in eight Cambodian provinces, contributing to the conservation of more than 760,600 hectares of forest and wildlife habitat.

The focus of SCW's work is sustainable Natural Resource Management [including the setup of Community Protected Areas (CPAs) and Community Fisheries (CFis)], climate change and renewable energy, environmental education as well as alternative livelihood options and Social Business, in order to face Cambodia's main environmental challenges, which are deforestation, illegal logging, poaching and destruction of wildlife habitats.

== History ==
SCW was started as Wildlife Rescue Initiative in 1999 by Ms. Kit WHITNEY, a US-American teacher, and officially registered with the Ministry of Interior on 29 July 2002 (Registration No. 728). In the first years, SCW’s work focused on training animal keeps and educating society on environmental awareness, collaborating with Phnom Tamao Wildlife Rescue Centre and Kampot Zoo. From May 2002 until June 2006, Ms. LIM Solinn lead SCW as Director, focusing on book publications and further teaching projects.

In July 2006, Mr. TEP Boonny was appointed Executive Director, guiding SCW to continuously adapting and improving its operation. He initiated the acquisition of international donors and partners, to allow the organization to further grow. By initiating Youth Debates in 2002 and milestone publications like the Atlas of Cambodia in 2014, the NGO has become an important actor for change in Cambodia to improve the country's environmental future.

2019 marks the 20th anniversary of Save Cambodia’s Wildlife, and represents a turning point for the organization towards financial independence, driven by Social Business. In 2018, SCW's own income passed the 20% mark.

SCW has entered long-term partnerships with Johanniter International in 2013 and in 2011 with Welthungerhilfe, in order to implement projects as local partner in the Northeast of Cambodia.

== Publications ==
=== Atlas of Cambodia ===
The second edition of the SCW's atlas of Cambodia, published in 2014, reflects recent developments in Cambodia and provides up to date knowledge and analysis of the changing spatial structures of Cambodia as well as its economic and social patterns, especially linked to natural resources and environmental management, such as biodiversity, climate, health, education, agriculture, ethnic minorities and economic development. Produced in cooperation with GIZ, The Asia Foundation, Oxfam and ForumSyd, in partnership with Open Development Cambodia.

=== Children's story books ===
Since 2002, SCW published several children's story books – among them Samnang and the Giant Catfish, published in 2006 and updated in 2017. The children's story books feature environmental topics in English and Khmer, and are prepared in a child friendly way with colorful illustrations.

== Social Business ==
SCW’s Strategic Direction 2017–2021 focuses on increased community ownership, part of which is Social Entrepreneurship. Since 2018, SCW launched its first Social Business product, pure Cambodian honey save wildlife to save wildlife, as well as natural beeswax and pollen propolis. This pure honey from Cambodia and the other bee products support local farmers to improve their livelihood and helps to protect wildlife habitats.

== Eco-tourism ==
SCW established and to-date supports two Eco-Tourism-Projects in Mondul Yorn and Prek Thnout. The Community-Based approach ensures an alternative source of income instead of poaching or illegal logging in protected areas. Furthermore, cultural exchange between the community and tourists raises awareness on local issues and encourages personal growth.
