= Friends of the Earth Korea =

South Korean non-profit

Friends of the Earth Korea is a non-profit organization in South Korea. It shares a vision and cooperates with Friends of the Earth for the conservation of nature and life.

Friends is better known in Korea as KFEM (Korean Federation for Environmental Movement), as well as "Korea Federation for Environmental Movements". KFEM consists of 50 local organizations, and its national headquarters is in Seoul. KFEM also has affiliated institutions in the specialized areas of conservation, environmental lawsuits, research, communication, education, publication, and the green market.

== See also ==
- Air pollution in South Korea
- Climate change in South Korea
- Environment of South Korea
- Pollution in Korea
