= Water and Rivers of Brittany =

Eau et rivières de Bretagne (Water and rivers of Brittany) is the second most important environmental organisation in Brittany, the first being the SEPNB (Société pour l'Étude et la Protection de la Nature en Bretagne – Society for the Study and Protection of Nature in Brittany) now called Bretagne Vivante (Living Brittany). It was created in November 1969 by anglers and environmentalists under the name APPSB (Association pour la Production et la Protection du Saumon en Bretagne – Association for the Production and Protection of Salmon in Brittany) which it kept until 1983. Since the beginning it has been linked to French organisations like the Association Nationale pour la Protection des Eaux et Rivières (National Association for the Protection of Rivers and Water Resources) and the Association Nationale de Défense des Rivières à Saumon (National Association for the Defence of Salmon Rivers), while remaining completely independent. The first leaders were Pierre Phélipot and above all Jean-Claude Pierre, who remained president of the association until 1985 and was general secretary afterwards for another 15 years. The association incorporated up to 2000 members and 83 local groups. Since the beginning, the association has been active on many issues and in many ways, which could be organised around three themes: informing, doing and defending.

- Informing: notably through the publication of its magazine: Saumons et truites (1971–1977), Eau et rivières (1977-the present day); and the establishment of a River Centre (Centre d'Initiation à la Rivière) in Belle-Isle-en-Terre.
- Doing: its main action since the beginning (but less so since the end of the 1980s) has been the organisation of huge river cleaning sites, which can bring together up to 1000 people, etc.
- Defending: the association has increasingly put the emphasis on expertise and on lobbying, and notably on suing polluters, etc.

== Sources ==
- Tudi Kernalegenn, Luttes écologistes dans le Finistère (1967–1981). Les chemins bretons de l'écologie, Fouesnant, Yoran embanner, 2006.
- Maurice Le Démezet and Bruno Maresca, La protection de la nature en Bretagne. La SEPNB (1953–2003), Rennes, PUR, 2003
- Chronology of Water and Rivers of Brittany
