= Korean Mountain Preservation League =

The Korean Mountain Preservation League, formerly the Korean Mountaineering League, is a non-profit non-governmental organization that focuses on the conservation of South Korea's mountain environments. It was founded in 2005 by Shawn James Morrissey, a mountaineer and author, who currently acts as the KMPL's president. The group is made up of Koreans and expatriates.

The KMPL's work includes: cleaning of littered trails and campsites; trail assessment; education of environmentally safe mountaineering practices; and campaigns against government legislation that will affect the mountain environments of Korea.
