= Association for Social and Environmental Development =

Indian non-profit organisation

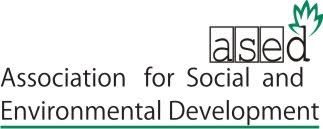
- Company type: Non-profit Organisation
- Founded: September 2001
- Founders: Diti Mookherjee and Rekha Basu
- Headquarters: Kolkata, India
- Area served: Kolkata, Delhi, Odisha, Hisar, and Sunderbans
- Website: www.asedkol.org

The Association for Social and Environmental Development (ASED) is an Indian non-profit organisation headquartered in Kolkata, West Bengal, India and registered under Section 25 of the Indian Companies Act. It promotes nature conservation and an ecologically resilient society, and undertakes programmes for school students.

ASED has worked with over 200 schools across the country. It has three flagship programmes, the "Green Rhinos" programme, "Nature Smart" and "Nature Club". These programmes are conducted under the guidance of the chief executive officer, Diti Mookherjee, a Fulbright-Nehru Fellow for Environmental Leadership.

== History ==
Founded by Diti Mookherjee and Rekha Basu on 7 September 2001, the Association for Social and Environmental Development (ASED) was established in order to actively engage youth in nature conservation in a sustained manner.

== Programmes ==
=== Green Rhinos ===
Launched in April 2012, the Green Rhinos programme envisions the existence of an Earth in which the youth, acting as a community, adopts a lifestyle which is ecologically resilient in nature. The programme hopes to fulfil the above objective through the creation of youth nature leaders involved in nature conversation through a transformational leadership process. The success of various biodiversity-related projects conducted by the Association for Social and Environmental Development extending from 2004 to 2010 convinced the chief executive officer of the organisation, Diti Mookherjee, to initiate a structured programme which would involve the active participation of students to develop their own projects relating to conservation. Thus, supported by the Rufford Foundation, the Green Rhinos programme was established in several schools in the Sundarbans in 2012 after which it was extended to Kolkata, Delhi, Orissa, and Hisar as well to include a total of 17 schools.

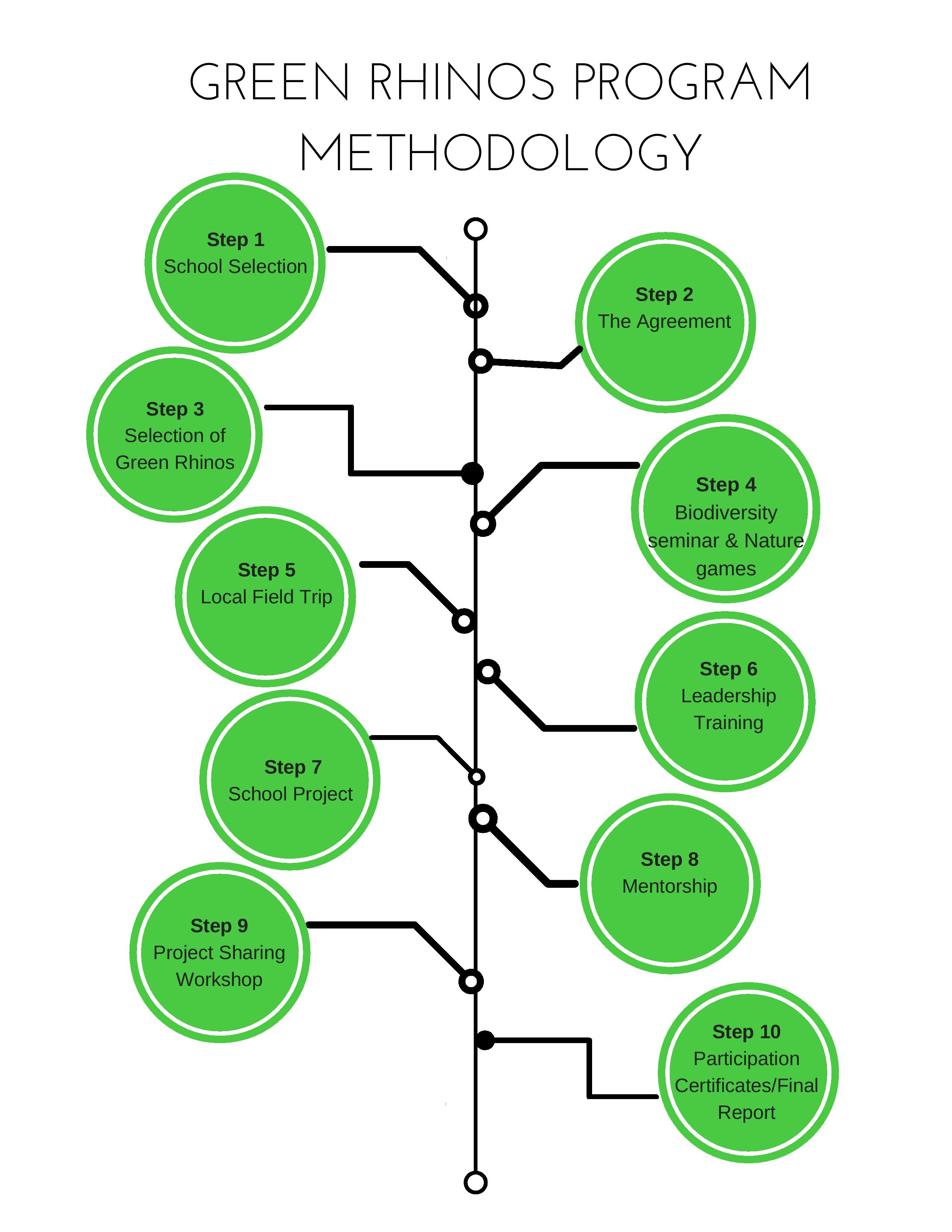
Methodology Summary Diagram FINAL-page-001

The methodology of the programme involves the formation of a Green Rhinos team comprising fifty ‘nature smart’ middle school students and two mentors. After nature orientation, seminars, audio-visual presentations, discussions and interactive games, the students are provided with the necessary tools required to create school-based projects which are to be executed in six months. The ASED team helps them to gain access to resources during the stipulated period and once the ten-month program cycle is completed, a ‘sharing workshop’ is held and the Green Rhinos receive a badge and certificate. The efforts of the organisation have resulted in the creation of over 3500 Green Rhinos who have successfully conducted various projects such as raising two thousand saplings and planting and nurturing as many as twenty thousand trees in the Sundarbans Biosphere Reserve and creating a butterfly garden within the Maheshtala Girls High School campus.
