= European Wildlife =

Pan-European non-profit organization

- Founded: April 22, 2008
- Founder: Dalibor Dostal
- Location: Kutna Hora, Czech Republic
- Website: www.eurowildlife.org

The European Wildlife is a Pan-European non-profit organization. Its main goal is nature conservation. The European Wildlife key objective is to conserve biological diversity and to reduce the impact of climate changes on nature and humankind. The main objective of European Wildlife is creating of non-state reserves and bio-corridors which would connect places with the most valuable biodiversity in Europe.

== History ==
The non-profit organization European Wildlife was established in 2008. It was founded by Dalibor Dostal, a journalist and a former editor in chief of one of the most popular serious newspaper in the Czech Republic.

In 2010 the European Wildlife starts its main project – the European Centre of Biodiversity, which should act as a "Noah's Ark" of endangered species of plants and animals in Europe.

== Main goals ==
The main objective of the European Wildlife is creating of non-state reserves and bio-corridors which would connect places with the most valuable biodiversity in Europe. However, its most significant project is to establish a European Centre of Biodiversity, a big non-state nature reserve in Central Europe.

Among other priorities of the European Wildlife is the climate change. As well as contributing to the deceleration of climate changes, its projects also engage in reforestation. Planting of new trees means better absorption of carbon dioxide which is a by-product of European factories, transport and households. Interconnecting the places with the abundance of wildlife diversity helps Europe adapt to the impacts of climate changes. While new forests help retaining the water in the landscape, biocorridors help the microorganisms endangered by rise in temperatures and climate fluctuations.

== The European bison Symbol ==
The well-known symbol of the European Wildlife conservation organization contains a silhouette of the European bison. The European bison is a symbol of a successful effort that was invested towards the rescue of animal species in situations where it seemed hopeless. All protectionist projects draw inspiration from that rescue of animals which were among the minority of the last ones to survive the First World War. Moreover, it is the largest land animal in Europe. The European bison also has a positive influence on European ecosystems. A number of species such as rare butterflies are becoming extinct only because there are no big herbivores living in Europe. Since 2009 the orange and black and white logo with the silhouette of the animal in an orange square has been a trademark of the European Wildlife organisation in all countries of European Union registered by Office for Harmonization in the Internal Market (OHIM).

== European Centre of Biodiversity ==
The most significant project of the European Wildlife is to establish the European Centre of Biodiversity, a big non-state nature reserve in Central Europe. Its placement is important in terms of maintaining biodiversity of the whole continent. That is because Central Europe now separates populations of wild animals which live in Northern, Eastern and Southern Europe. The establishment of European centre of biodiversity should be an important step towards their mutual interconnection and thus maintaining wildlife diversity in Europe long-term.

The European Wildlife aim is to create a reserve which would be ten times ten kilometres large. The objective is to create an area big enough, a forest with a natural variety of woody species which, in future, would enable endangered species – especially large European mammals – to return. Some species such as European bison will be brought back again.

== See also ==
- Conservation movement
- Natural environment
- Sustainability
