= Workshop for All Beings =

Polish ecological non-governmental organization

Workshop for All Beings - is a Polish ecological non-governmental organization. It was established and gained a legal status in 1990. In their activity they follow the philosophy of Deep Ecology. Their goal is preservation of wild nature and its most valuable areas as well as conservation of its natural biological processes.

Their projects aim to sustain a diverse ecosystem with all its species, processes and natural cycles. The Workshop for All Beings declares an independence of any national, political or religious institutions. It cooperates with other like-minded organizations including: Lesoochranárske Zoskupenie Vlk, Earth First! and Greenpeace.

It was repeatedly prized with prestigious awards including Wiktor Godlewski's prize for educational operation and actions for preserving the nature in 2008.

== History ==
The very beginning of the Workshop took place in the mid 1980s at the Department of Urban and Spatial Planning at the Faculty of Architecture of the Silesian University of Technology.
Back then it used to be an informal group named Workshop of Live Architecture. The current name was adopted on the turn of 1988 and 1989.
Primarily their operations were focused on the Southern regions of Poland. The organization conducted projects on preservation of the Wapienica Valley in Bielsko-Biała, they protested against building a coke plant just by the Polish border in Stonava in the Czech Republic, against building of a nuclear power plant in Żarnowiec as well as against deforestation of Bielsko-Biała.

== Activity ==
Among the successes of the Workshop for All Beings there are:

- establishing a moratorium on deforestation in the Białowieża forest and a double enlargement of the Białowieża National Park.
- Establishing a legal protection of the natural and scenic complex the Wapienica Valley
- Establishing the animal species protection of wolf and lynx
- Blocking a car racing "Trophy of Poland 2001" on the protected areas of the Bieszczady Mountains
- obtaining a positive sentence of the Supreme Administrative Court of Poland in 2005 that lead to a deconstruction of illegal chairlifts on the Pilsko mountain
- co-organizing the first social protest against the improper localization of a road – the highway in the Scenic Park of St. Anna's Mountain

Many projects which were started years ago proceeded currently:

- since 1998 – taking part in protecting the Rospuda Valley and standing against building a ring road running through it
- standing against winter Olympics Games held in the Tatra Mountains; currently also protesting against an uncontrolled infrastructural expansion in this region
- taking action concerning threats to the nature caused by new-built highways and motorways; monitoring their possible collisions with wildlife corridors
- co-initiating the idea of creating the Turnicki National Park in the Przemyśl Foothill area
- monitoring the spreading of mass tourism in mountain areas in Poland
- running innovative ecological education programs that successfully motivate people to nature's preservation activity including: Council of All Beings workshop and Guards of Valuable Natural Areas training

== Current state ==
Currently the association has 3 formal and 1 informal division. It gathers around 100 members.

Workshop for All Beings edits the Wild Life magazine with 3500 copies of circulation as well as books, movies, postcards, posters etc.

== Sources ==
Workshop for All Beings home website
