= Group for the Environment, Renewable Energy and Solidarity =

Group for the Environment, Renewable Energy and Solidarity (GERES) is an international development NGO set up in Marseille in 1976.

== Background ==
The Groupement pour l'Exploitation Rationnelle de l'Energie Soldaire (Group for the Rational Use of Solar Energy) was founded on 14 September 1976, following the first oil crisis, at the initiative of teachers/researchers working with Georges Peri. Its aim was to put researchers and professionals in touch in order to develop solar energy solutions.

GERES changed its name first in 1986 (Groupe Energies Renouvelables / Renewable Energies Group), again in 1994 (Groupe Energies Renouvelables et Environnement / Renewable Energies and Environment Group), and then finally in 2008 (Groupe Energies Renouvelables, Environnement et Solidarités / Group for the Environment, Renewable Energy and Solidarity) as it broadened its areas of intervention.

In 2004, GERES launched CO2Solidaire, the first French carbon offsetting programme.

== Activities ==
As an organisation specialising in sustainable and renewable energies, climate change and environmental protection, GERES works for an energy transition, along with natural resource conservation and improved living conditions for local people, both in Europe and in the developing world.

As lead agency for the Climate and Development Committee of Coordination SUD, for the period 2013 - 2016, GERES is working with other NGOs to engage in advocacy with authorities aimed at guiding national and international climate change policy.

GERES promotes renewable energy use and local economic development in four broad geographic areas: Europe and the Mediterranean, West Africa, Central Asia and Southeast Asia.

It is present in a dozen or so countries working alongside local development actors around five core themes:

- clean energy production
- energy efficiency and energy saving
- economic development
- local policy and land use
- climate change
