= Transitforum Austria Tirol =

The Transitforum Austria Tirol is an Austrian all-party non-governmental organization, which advocates for a reduction of international through traffic on Austrian roads, for environmental, economic, and medical reasons. The initiative is primarily targeted at truck transport.

The organization was founded in Tyrol, which is significantly affected by international through traffic, but later teamed up with similar groups across Austria. It is well known for its use of nonviolent direct action in campaigns, e.g. blocking motorways.

A blocking of the Brenner Pass lead to the Court of Justice case Schmidberger v Austria.

The Transitforum Austria Tirol and its chairman Fritz Gurgiser also voice their concerns, and often harsh criticism on politicians regularly in regional media, especially in Tyrol.
