= China greentech initiative =

China Greentech Initiative
- Type: Privately owned
- Industry: Green technology
- Founded: 2008
- Headquarters: Beijing, China
- Key people: Ellen Carberry, co-founder and Managing Director; Randall Hancock, co-founder and Managing Director; Alan Beebe, Managing Director - Research and Delivery
- Website: www.china-greentech.com

The China Greentech Initiative (CGTI) is a Chinese-international open source, commercial collaboration platform. It includes over 100 technology and services companies and over 500 businesspeople focusing on the growth of China's greentech markets. The organization was founded in 2008 by Ellen G. Carberry and Randall S. Hancock, and is produced by MangoStrategy, LLC.

== The report ==
The China Greentech Report is a free, annual report published in English and Chinese by the China Greentech Initiative. It is an update of the recent developments in the greentech sector in China. The China Greentech Report 2012 analyses four key factors that characterise challenges and opportunities in China's greentech markets, including:

- How China and global economic forces have impacted greentech growth
- Aggressive government policies will continue to support greentech growth
- Public awareness of urgent environmental problems is growing
- China is going global to satisfy energy security needs and to meet emission reduction goals

== The Partner Program ==
The CGTI 2012 Partner Program examines opportunities in five sector tracks: cleaner conventional energy, renewable energy, green building, cleaner transportation, and clean water. In addition, CGTI is in discussion with partners interested in launching cross sector tracks which examine opportunities in low carbon zones, waste management, green supply chain, and China outbound markets.

== Advisory services ==
The China Greentech Initiative's advisory services provide partner companies and organizations with projects to meet specific needs that are beyond the scope of what the Partner Program provides, including:

- Custom Strategic Market Studies - Answering opportunity-specific questions related to market size, user requirements, value chain structure and economics, competitor and partner assessments, technology evaluations, and the legal/regulatory environment.
- Partner Matchmaking - Assisting with the identification and assessment of potential business relationships, and providing referrals for financing sources, investments and M&A transactions.
- Custom Thought Leadership and Education - Developing external publications and education programs that meet specific partner branding and stakeholder education objectives.

== Media ==
The China Greentech has been mentioned in many media outlets, notably The New York Times, The Guardian, The Economist, and the China Daily.
