= Wildlife Research and Conservation Trust =

Indian non-governmental organisation

WRCT
- Formation: 2005
- Headquarters: Nilambur, India
- Executive Board: K.S Anoop Das, Peroth Balakrishnan, K. Abdul Riyas, Debanik Mukherjee, S. Manchi Shirish
- Website: wrctindia.org

Wildlife Research and Conservation Trust is a non-governmental conservation and research organisation based in Nilambur, India. The mission of Wildlife Research and Conservation Trust is the conservation of nature and natural resources in the Indian subcontinent through field research and conservation action. The organisation was founded in 2005.

The major objectives of the trust are to: undertake field research to promote the conservation of wildlife and natural resources in India; develop and advocate participatory management and conservation programmes for the restoration of wildlife and ecosystems; and promote sustainable use of natural resources, equitable development and the maintenance of cultural and traditional attributes of indigenous communities.

WRCT attempts to accomplish quality research under the broad umbrella of both applied and pure ecology. They pursue specific topics integrating wide variety of taxa at different ecological scales: ecosystem, community, population and species levels. Research and activities contributing to immediate conservation efforts are priority. WRCT constitute people with wide variety of expertise and approach which we accordingly integrate in their research. The research at WRCT falls under the following themes: biodiversity characterization, patterns and monitoring, global change ecology, people and conservation, community and population ecology and behavioural and evolutionary ecology.

WRCT conducts a large number of research programmes in a variety of habitats on diverse taxa with supports from UNEP-Eco-Peace Leadership Centre, S. Korea; INASP, UK; Critical Ecosystem Partnership Fund and Idea Wild - USA. Some of the current and recent projects include: aquatic insect diversity in natural water-filled tree holes and their artificial analogues, in a tropical rainforest, use of research evidence in conservation planning by conservation managers in the Western Ghats biodiversity hotspot, monitoring of urban sparrows. WRCT also operates a citizen science programme called snake sense to prevent the malicious killing of the non-venomous snakes since 2005.
