= SARP UK =

British environmental organisation

SARP UK was a British chemical waste company and a subsidiary of Vivendi.

== History ==
The company operated a chemical waste plant and incinerator in Killamarsh that caused widespread controversy. The plant released toxic gas into the nearby community in May 1998, and residents began a campaign calling for the plant's closure. Six of the plant's seven sections closed in 1999. The remnant closed in 2002.

In 1999, SARP was fined £120,000 and ordered to pay £150,000 in costs at Derby Crown Court.

== Protests ==
Residents Against SARP Pollution (RASP) was formed in June 1998 in response to two incidents of toxic gases escaping the SARP UK chemical plant in May 1998. The campaign was formed by local residents and members of the Socialist Party. The campaign forced the closure of most of the SARP plant.

The year-long campaign involved marches and rooftop protests. RASP protesters travelled to SARP's headquarters in France to protest.

The campaigners eventually won the closure of six of the seven sections of the site in late 1999.
