= Environmental Forum for Action =

The Environmental Forum for Action (ENFORAC) is a coalition of 16 environmental non-governmental organisations, community groups and academic institutions that have come together as a united voice to protect and advocate for Sierra Leone’s natural resources. Formed in 2004, it was not officially launched until April 2006.

ENFORAC is registered with the Corporate Affairs Commission as a Not For Profit Company Limited by Guarantee: 24 August 2020.

The ENFORAC logo represents two White-Necked Picathartes' facing each other in dialogue on river banks beneath a tree.

Picathartes gymnocephalus is also endemic to the Upper Guinea Rainforest and was selected to represent human depletion of this ecosystem.
