= New Zealand Institute of Environmental Health =

The New Zealand Institute of Environmental Health (NZIEH) is a non-governmental, non-profit organisation that promotes best practice in environmental health and represents those engaged in environmental and health protection fields in New Zealand. It was incorporated as a Society in 1920 and is a member of the International Federation of Environmental Health.

== Activities ==
A representative from NZIEH was part of the committee that produced the 2010 NZS 6806 standard on "Acoustics – Road traffic noise" on behalf of Standards New Zealand.
