= Fondation Pacifique =

Switzerland-based non-profit organisation

- Formation: 2002
- Founded: 2002; Geneva, Switzerland
- Type: Foundation
- Purpose: Oceans, Environmentalism
- Location: Geneva, Switzerland
- Region served: International
- Method: Research, Communication, Education, Share experience
- Website: pacifique.ch/en/

The Fondation Pacifique is a Switzerland-based non-profit organisation with the mission to play an innovative role in the conservation of the oceans. The foundation's projects are articulated around its flagship: the sailing boat Fleur de Passion which circumnavigates the world exploring its most important and threatened marine regions as identified by the WWF’s Global 200 project.

To carry out its mission the foundation maintains a partnership network of leading organisations in the scientific, conservation, eco-tourism and media fields. The organisation acts as a supporting and strengthening element, not only assembling skills and know-how but also contributing its resources to the particular mission of each of its partners and communicating the underlying conservation issues to a wider public.

== Objectives ==
Fondation Pacifique´s mission to play an innovative role in protecting the oceans is carried out by focussing on three main objectives:

1. Scientific Research: Contributing to a better scientific understanding of the marine environment, in particular by providing scientists access to the organisation's expedition vessel "Fleur de Passion"
2. Communication & Education: Raising public awareness and media attention on marine conservation issues making use of cutting-edge communication tools
3. Participation: Giving members of the Foundation and further individuals the opportunity to become involved in projects as eco-volunteers

== History ==
The history began in early 2000 with the creation of the Association Pacifique and the inauguration of the Association Antinea in 2005. Both organisation were based in Geneva, Switzerland.

In 2002, the Association Pacifique bought "Fleur de Passion", an almost 60-year-old abandoned 32-meter sailing boat. This boat was used by its previous owner in the Mediterranean and the Atlantic in the framework of socio-educational, navigation, diving and scientific projects. Since 2001, the Association Pacifique worked assiduously to completely restore Fleur de Passion, preparing it to sail once again soon.

Meanwhile, the Association Antinea had as its objective to organise a global circumnavigation on board of a yacht which would serve as a platform for research and communication, in a quest to contribute to the protection of the marine environment. The sailing ship Antinea, a 17-meter sloop accomplished the first leg of the expedition, crossing the Atlantic from the Caribbean to Europe in 2005. The project quickly outgrew its humble beginnings with the realisation that the boat had become too small to fulfill Antinea's new ambitions.

Realising that the objectives of the two organisations were complementary, the Associations Pacifique and Antinea decided, at the beginning of 2006, to unite their assets, resources and energy and create the Antinea Foundation effectively carrying out their projects together. In June 2007 the Antinea Foundation was officially established as a foundation under Swiss law. In 2014 the foundation and continued as Fondation Pacifique.

== The Changing Oceans Expedition ==
On October 8, 2008 at the World Conservation Congress in Barcelona the Antinea Foundation, in partnership with the International Union for Conservation of Nature (IUCN), launched a worldwide expedition called "The Changing Oceans Expedition". (Note: Not to be confused with The Changing Oceans Expedition, Heriot Watt University's expedition performed with "Royal Research Ship James Cook.") The purpose of the initiative was to take stock of the current state of the oceans, study to what extent how they have changed especially in regard to human activity and explore what solutions are available to strengthen their health.

During its voyage, Antinea's flagship Fleur de Passion visited marine sites in six seas that are exceptional for the richness of their biodiversity. Included in those were marine World Heritage Site and other globally significant marine protected areas. Small and large organisations were given access to use the ship for research purposes. The expedition followed the routes of past expeditions, and compared modern surveys with ancient logbooks in order to measure the changes that occurred in the past decades. IUCN, through its Marine programme, collaborated to retrace the most significant expeditions, to develop the tools needed to measure and understand the trends in ocean conservation.

== The Flagship Fleur de Passion ==
Fleur de Passion is the Foundation's flagship and project station. It is a sailing ship with a surprising past. Originally a motor boat of the German Navy, it was built in 1941 for war services, such as de-mining and resupplying submarines. For this reason, the boat has a mixed structure with a wooden hull and steel ribs. In 1945 it was surrendered to the French Navy in compensation for war damages. In 1976 it was disarmed and sold to an individual who transformed it into a ketch and named it Fleur de Passion. For the following 20 years it was used in the Mediterranean and the Atlantic for socio-educational and scientific activities. Fleur de Passion, which had been abandoned for years, was bought in 2002 by the Association Pacifique and put it in a dry dock in January 2003 to start its total restoration. After more than 5 years and 60,000 hour of work it was ready to set sail.

Between April 2015 and September 2019, Fleur de Passion took part in "The Ocean Mapping Expedition" following the way of Ferdinand Magellan mixing scientific, cultural and educational goals. The sail started and ended in Sevilla.
