= Pragya =

Development organisation

- Founded: 6 July 1995
- Type: NGO, registered charity
- Location: Gurgaon (India), Kathmandu (Nepal), London (UK), Nairobi (Kenya), New York (USA)
- Region served: Remote disadvantaged areas in Himalayas and East Africa
- Website: www.pragya.org

Pragya is a development organisation which addresses the needs of people living in areas such as high-altitude regions and areas emerging from conflict. Pragya implements projects in the high-altitude Himalayan regions of India and Nepal, and the highlands and savannas of East Africa.

Pragya shapes and enables sustainable development with a focus on communities and ecosystems in remote and hard-to-reach areas of the world, focusing on social development, natural resource management, appropriate technology, and enterprise development.

== History ==
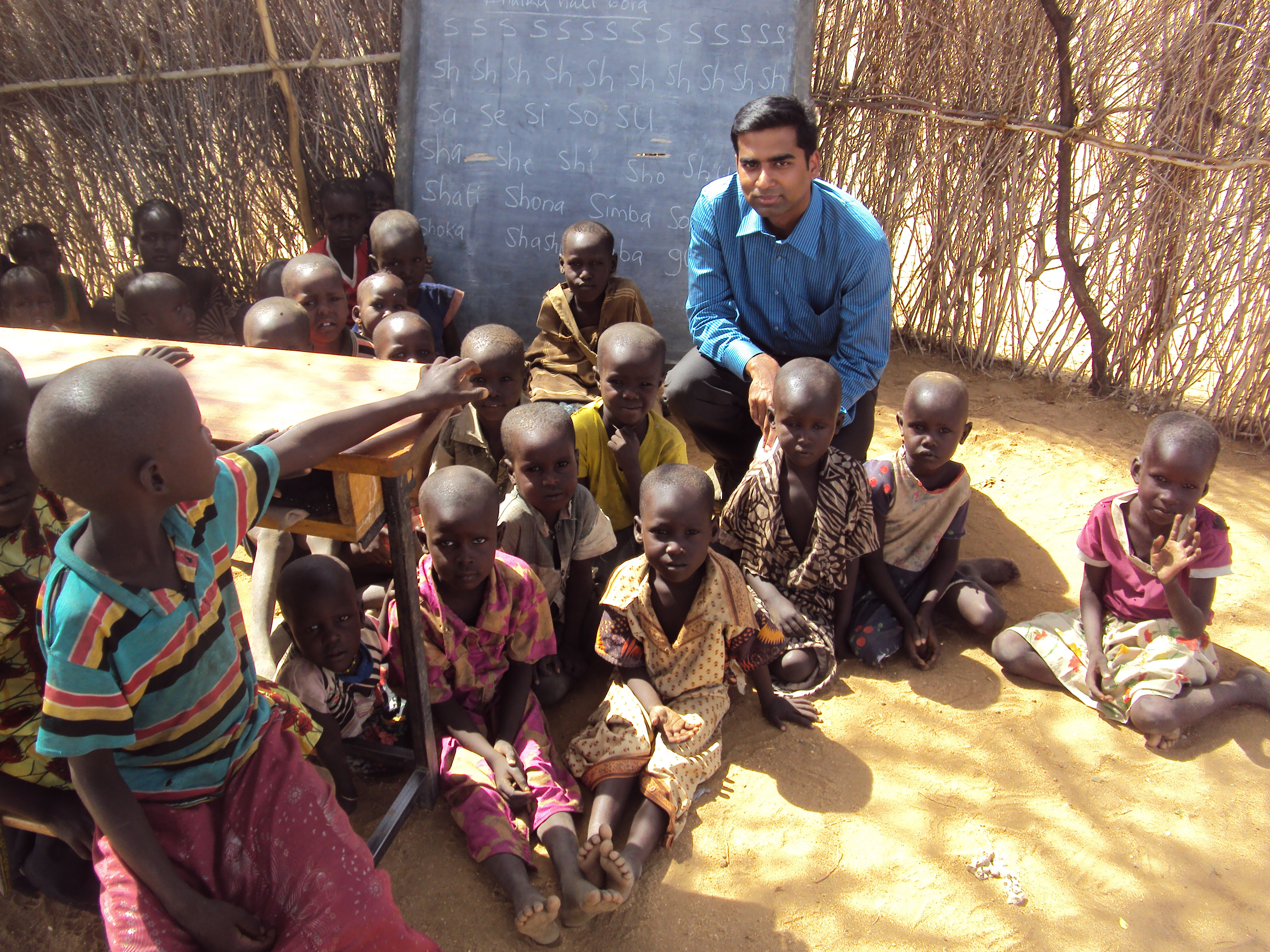
Pragya in Kenya

Pragya was founded in 1995 to address the serious issues that face indigenous communities in the high Indian Himalayas. Since then, Pragya has worked to protect the natural environment of the Himalayas and support the people. Pragya is an alliance of practitioners.

In its early work, Pragya took care of the ecosystems and cultures of the people who lived in the Indian Himalayas. Pragya has been successful in developing solutions such as the reduction of available water, medicinal plants, and livelihood options. The area of focus has now grown to include working in Nepal and East Africa. Pragya is conducting research and delivering services in the fields of education, health, water and sanitation, natural resource management, renewable energy, women's empowerment, and sustainable livelihoods.

== Programmes ==
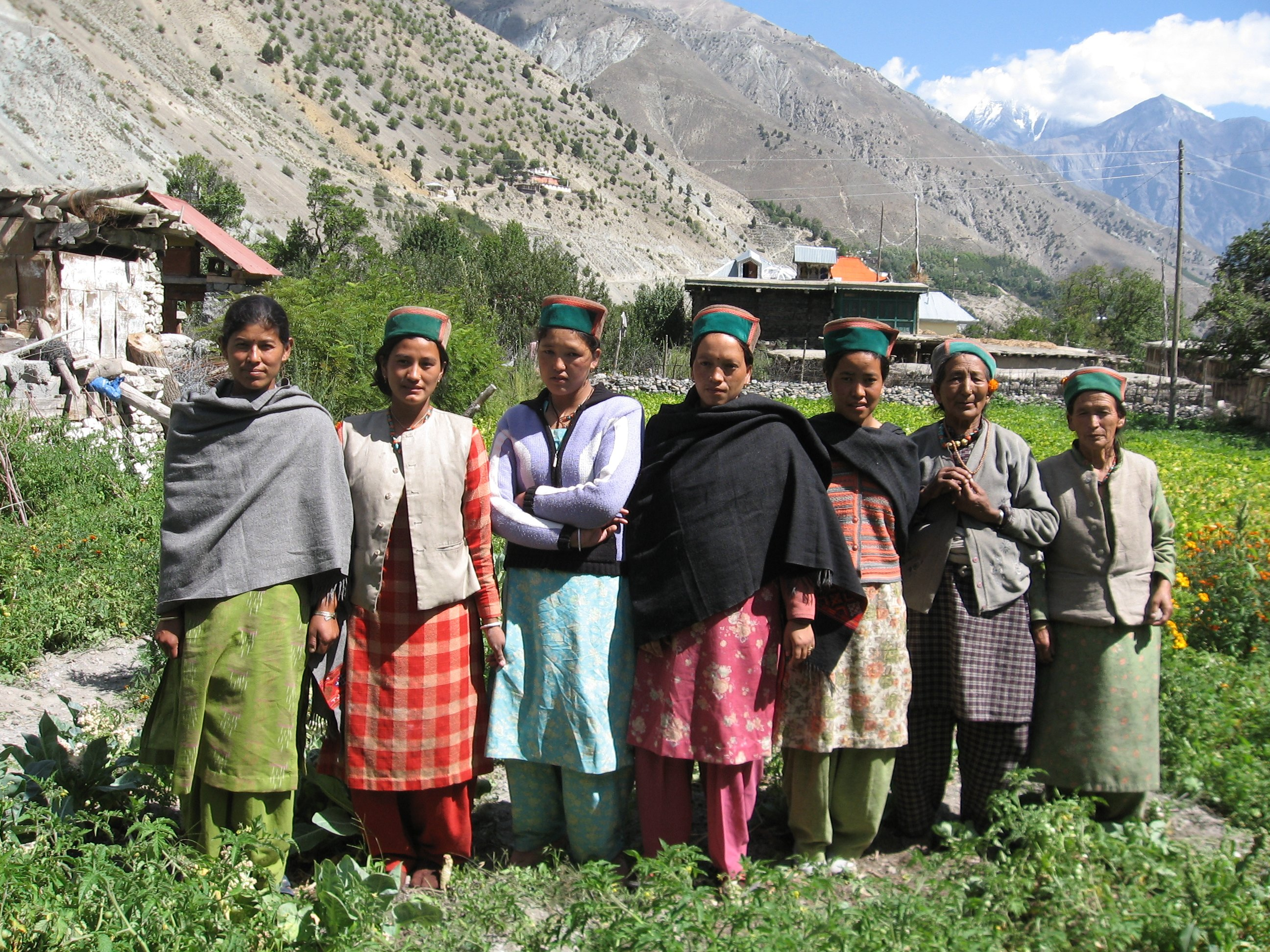
A women's self-help group in the Himalayas

Pragya's work engages with the specific needs and challenges faced by people in remote and ecologically sensitive areas. The goals of these projects are to build the skills of people within the local communities. The projects also provide them with security and access to facilities for health and education. It also helps these communities find ways to make use of the natural resources available to them, helping to preserve the balance between local communities and their natural environment.

Pragya focuses on research and advocacy to highlight the needs of people in these areas so that they have the opportunity to be included in mainstream development.

Pragya projects have directly benefited 31,583 people in the Himalayan region in 2010-11. 21,570 (68.2%) of these were children. Apart from this, Pragya's projects reached 700,000 people, including 490,000 children.

=== Social Development Projects ===
Education and information facilities - Pragya has been developing alternative learning centres and libraries for remote and marginalized communities that remain excluded from mainstream education. 112 education centres, 38 resource centres (19 IT-enabled) are serving to reduce the education and information gap in the Himalayas and Sub Saharan Africa. Pragya has piloted several innovations to reach education to the marginalised communities, and have been internationally recognised for its efforts.

Basic welfare services for migrant workers in the Himalayas - Pragya is implementing a programme to address the basic welfare needs of migrant labourers working on road construction/maintenance in the high altitude Himalayas. Creches deliver early childhood care and ‘schools on wheels’ (mobile vans with computers and learning toys) provide primary education to the children in the labour camps. Protective gears, water filters and health camps are ensuring improved health, while advocacy is working towards long-term benefits.

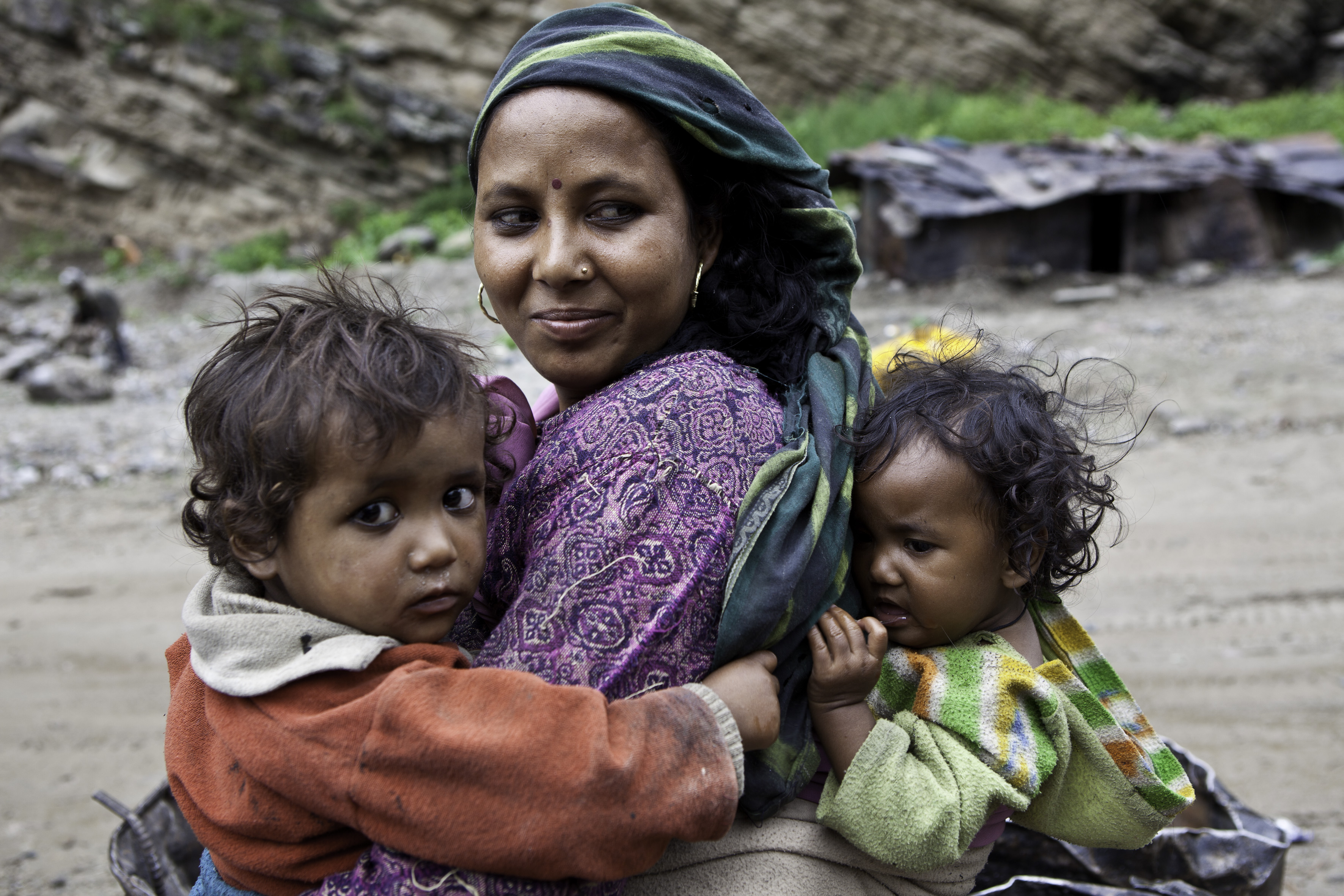
A migrant road worker in the Central Himalayas

Community managed resource centres - Integrated community development is being facilitated through community resource centres. These centres are equipped with libraries, computers, databases for marketing and government support and facilities for training and vocational skill-building.

Health and nutrition for disadvantaged communities - Pragya has been working to improve the nutritional and health status of rural communities. The work addresses critical levels of malnutrition and associated health problems in the region. A pilot scheme in Nepal is now being expanded to Indian Himalayas and Kenyan Arid and Semi Arid provinces.

Livelihoods and income generation - Pragya is developing 16 enterprises, 95 women's self-help groups, and more than 45 small enterprises and cooperatives. It has also set up buyer-seller linkages, production and sales centres in the region. For increasing visibility of local heritage based enterprises, 15 heritage museums/eco-trails have also been set up.

Rights awareness and advocacy - Pragya is working to enhance participation in democratic processes among indigenous tribes to empower marginalized groups. Local representatives and leaders have been elected to enhance civil society engagement. Development media has been promoted through citizen journalism and people-state interfaces. Pragya has held more than 20 national/regional advocacy events. It has developed and anchored the High Himalaya Forum and Himalayan Heritage Network as effective advocacy platforms.

=== Natural resource management and appropriate technology projects ===
Pragya adapts available technologies (such as for water and energy) to tune them to the geographical context of the regions Pragya work in. It is important to make the available technologies more suitable for rural application.

Renewable energy - Pragya has designed a decentralised renewable energy application for remote villages as most of these villages had remained without electricity. Pragya also set up two of the highest solar-wind hybrid systems in the world. The model has been incorporated in the Government of India policy for rural electrification.

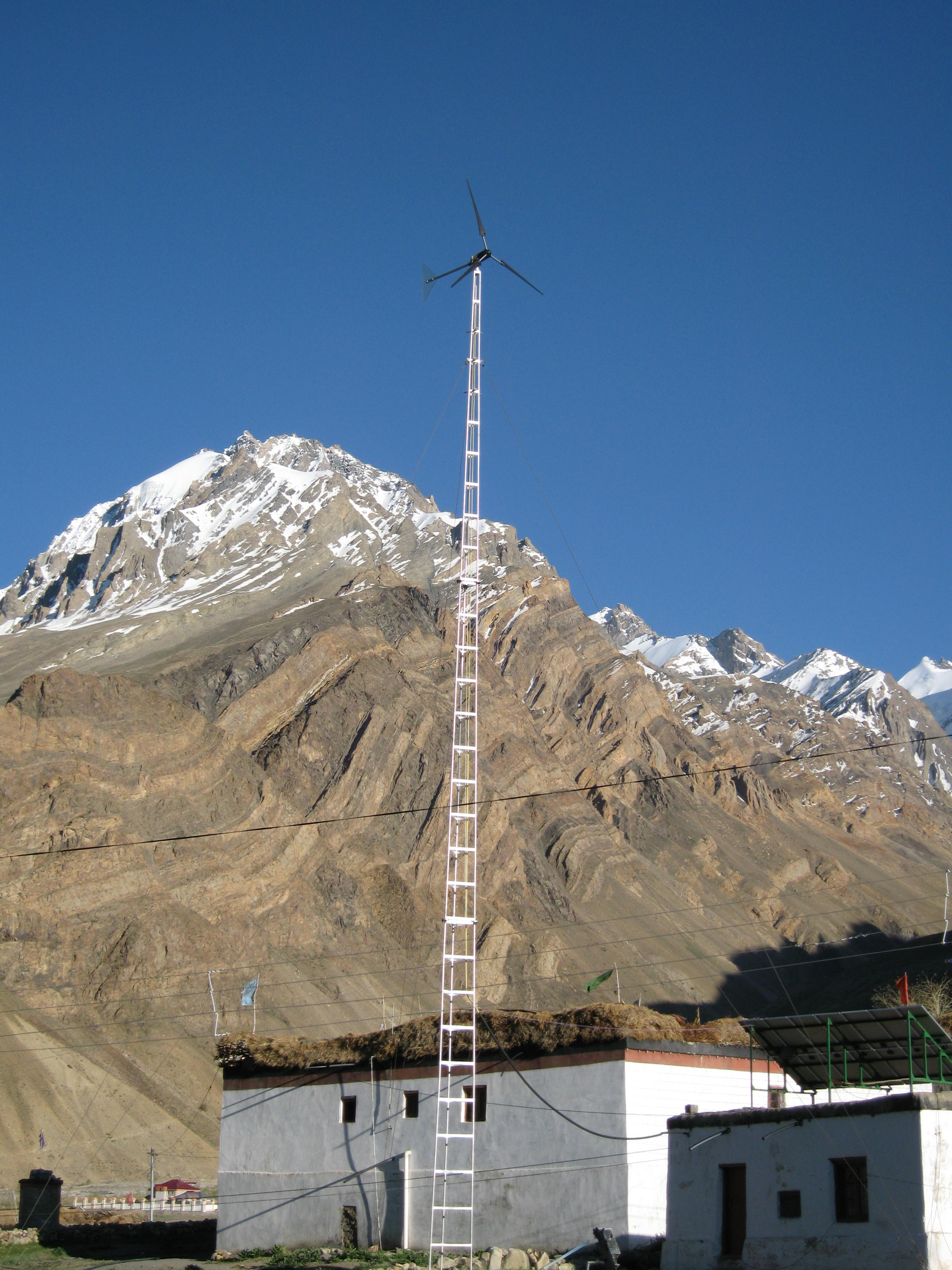
A combined wind/Solar power system providing electricity for the village of Lossar

Medicinal plant conservation and sustainable livelihoods - A globally recognised intervention that combines conservation of medicinal herbs while growing them as cash crops has benefitted Himalayan farmers and Pragya is currently using the same model in East Africa. Pragya developed cultivation protocols through rigorous research at their Germ plasm banks and 13 nurseries. Support for market linkages were provided to women's self-help groups and farmers cooperatives. The plants threatened by: deforestation, climate change, over-use and destructive harvesting are also being conserved through 11 community managed In-situ Conservation Areas, Herbal Gardens.

Participatory land and water management - Six different snow and water management technologies have been developed and more than 21 sites have been set up for demonstration in the Indian and Nepal Himalayas. Over 100 structures have been set up for water to use in remote villages and nomadic groups, and nine warehouses constructed for food security.

Safe water and sanitation - Pragya has been working to improve the health and hygiene of the communities in the Himalayas and African arid lands, by creating facilities for enhanced access to safe drinking water and sanitation facilities. A blend of traditional knowledge and scientific inputs, tested and perfected over past years, has been applied for the revitalisation of natural springs used as drinking water source, water storage and most importantly filtration systems have been established in most water-starved villages. Masons and women's groups are trained for maintenance and replication.

=== Pragya's relief and rehabilitation efforts ===
In August 2010, a cloudburst in the Ladakh Himalayas triggered flashfloods across the region and caused several deaths, massive destruction of property and infrastructure and much misery to the Ladakhis. Dozens of NGOs provided basic relief work and rescue including Pragya. Pragya conducted a rapid assessment of immediate local needs and stepped in with an appeal for relief. Funds raised contributed to water and sanitation facilities for victims, the provision of medical help and other relief material, and months of intensive relief work. Pragya's efforts were recognised by the national government and the district administration in Ladakh. The floods damaged the town and 40 surrounding villages and devastated community structures, affecting the storage of food items. Pragya established prefabricated, weather-proof, insulated warehouses for food storage in association with Care Today, Comic Relief, and the Big Lottery Fund. Pragya is now helping rebuild the lives of the residents in remote villages in Leh through a dedicated three-year programme.

The Himalayan states of Uttarakhand and Himachal Pradesh were hit by torrential rain, landslides, and flash floods on June 14–17, 2013. The Pragya ground staff in Chamoli, Uttarkashi, Rudraprayag (Uttarakhand), and Kinnaur (Himachal Pradesh) worked to provide humanitarian support, as the team in Gurgaon sent across necessary relief material. We have supplied food to relief camps and medicines to the health department. Blankets, tarpaulins, tents, water purification tablets, medicines, rations, and hygiene kits have been reaching remote villages, and stationery items, tents, and teaching aids have been provided to schools damaged by the flood. Pragya staff have also provided coordination and IT support at the District administration-facilitated Control Room at Joshimath. Thanks to our supporters, we were able to provide 17 consignments of medicines, 4103 blankets and bedsheets, 81000+ packets of food items, 5199 kg of food grains, 74000 water purification tablets, 4579 personal hygiene items, and 443 tarpaulins to the flood-affected people. Pragya is currently running Mobile Health Vans in 2 districts to address health concerns and has initiated rehabilitation measures for livelihood, education, water and sanitation provisions in 4 districts of Uttarakhand. The team also recorded its learnings and brought out a set of recommendations for a Himalaya Adapted disaster Management strategy.

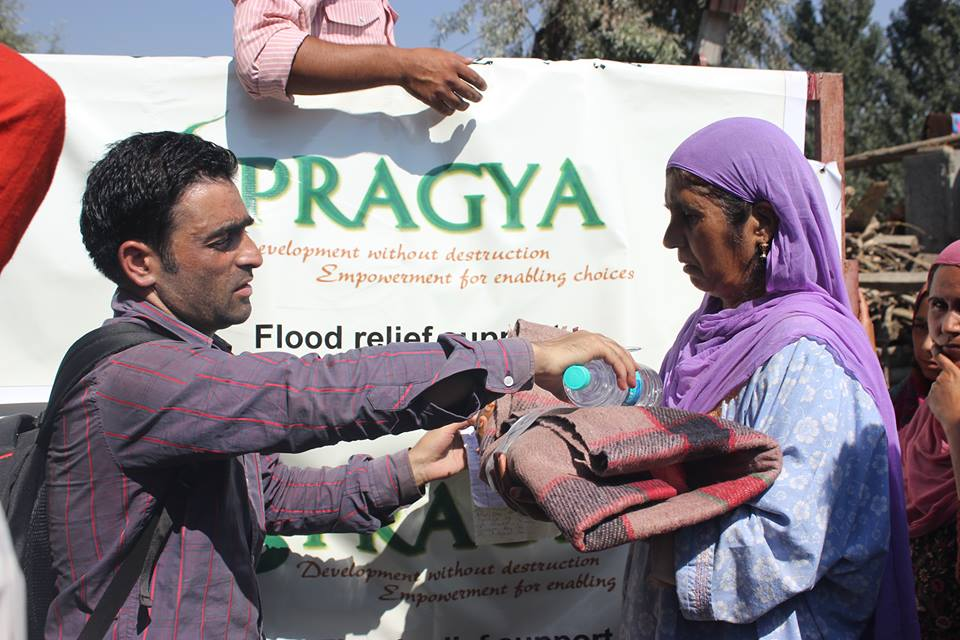
From Pragya's flood relief work. More details at: https://pragya.org/floodsinJandk.php

Torrential rains caused massive destruction and severe distress in the Himalayan state of Jammu and Kashmir in September 2014, with several fatalities and large numbers displaced. The state experienced the worst flood in 109 years. Pragya is currently working to respond to the needs of the affected people in Jammu, Srinagar, Pulwama, Budgam, Kulgam, Anantnag, and Baramulla districts. Thanks to our supporters, we have reached 9954 items of hygiene kits, 282 packs of baby food, 914 nutrition packs and warm wear kits for children, 102 medicine kits, 13332 kg of food grains and spices, 8287 packs of ready-to-eat food items, 1949 blankets, 160 sets of utensils and emergency lights, 2148 litres of water, and 22040 water purifying tablets so far.

== Research and advocacy ==
Development research - Pragya's contribution to development research includes a comprehensive inventory and threat assessment of more than 2000 Himalayan medicinal plants species; vulnerability assessment of 82 high altitude watersheds; assessment of education facilities across high altitude Indian Himalayas; study of microfinance interventions in mountain context in three continents and development of a poor mountain microfinance model. Pragya has also conducted research on critical issues, development initiatives and gaps therein for parts of Sub-Saharan Africa and Himalaya. In particular, they have focused on: conflict situations and status of civil society engagement in East Africa, micro-enterprise development prototype, non-farm enterprises in Eastern Himalayas, water management in cold deserts, need for inclusive and culturally attuned development.

Advocacy for key issues - Pragya has concentrated on raising awareness on the impacts of climate change on the Himalayan and East African ecology and lives of the resident communities. Pragya has conducted national seminars involving ministers, policy makers, scientists, grassroots communities on adaption to ecological change and increasing levels of environmental threats, sustainable development solutions. The UK and US offices have also put Pragya on the international scale as a development organisation and it has positioned to input into global deliberations on key issues and ensure that the voices of the disadvantaged are heard. Pragya has Special Consultative status with UN ECOSOC and has submitted statements on State & Non-State Development Collaborations - for UN ECOSOC High-level segment: annual ministerial review for 2014 session and on Violence against women in indigenous communities - as part of 57th session of UN Commission on the Status of Women (4–15 March 2013).
