= Rodne Galicha =

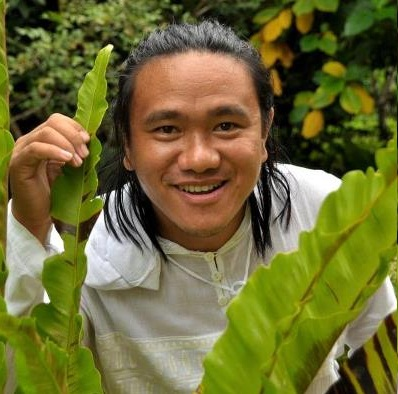
- Rodne Galicha, 2011.
- Born: 2 June 1979 (age 47); San Fernando, Romblon, Philippines
- Education: University of Santo Tomas
- Occupations: environment activist, community organizer, Non-governmental organization, Conservationist
- Awards: National Individual Award Recipient, 2013 Heroes for Environment Awards; 2018 The Outstanding Young Men (TOYM)
- Website: http://rodgalicha.com

Rodne Rodiño Galicha (born 2 June 1979, San Fernando, Sibuyan Island, Romblon, Philippines, eldest son of government employee Nenita Rodiño y Romero of San Fernando, Romblon, and postman Rodrigo Galicha y Galindez of Alcantara, Romblon) is a Filipino environmentalist and human rights advocate currently involved in climate justice, biodiversity conservation and natural resources conflict management. He is the author of a pocket-sized book on emerging environment issues: We Are Nature. On 5 December 2013, he received the 2013 Hero for the Environment national individual award from the Center for Environmental Concerns in collaboration with the Department of Environment and Natural Resources of the Republic of the Philippines. He was Philippine Manager for The Climate Reality Project and currently doing his voluntary work for ecological and cultural organization called Bayay Sibuyanon in his home-island of Sibuyan. In 2018, the Philippine Tatler included him in the Generation T list as one of the 50 brightest connectors, creative visionaries, influential innovators and disruptive talents in the Philippines. He is also one of the recipients of the 2018 The Outstanding Young Men (TOYM) of the Philippines. Stepping-up climate and environmental action, he heads Living Laudato Si movement in the Philippines; and national convener of Aksyon Klima Pilipinas since 2020. He co-founded OeconoMedia, a faith-based news platform that produces and distributes original reporting about the environment, the climate crisis, and the global Laudato si' campaign of the Catholic Church.

== Education ==
Galicha studied elementary at San Fernando Central School and finished his secondary education at Sibuyan Polytechnic College (now Romblon State University). Desiring to become a priest someday, he took up preparatory college courses at the San Lorenzo Ruiz Seminary in Romblon, Romblon. He was then admitted to the Royal and Pontifical Interdiocesan Seminary of the Philippines, the University of Santo Tomas - Central Seminary where he stayed as resident seminarian for four years.

A graduate of Baccalaureate in Philosophy and Bachelor of Arts Classical from the Faculties of Ecclesiastical Studies, Galicha taught environmental ethics, sociology, Philippine history and philosophy at Colegio de San Juan de Letran in Intramuros, Manila, from 2002 to 2005. He became a visiting scholar at the Catholic University of Louvain in 2009, and obtained a Joint Diploma in Integral Ecology from the Pontifical Gregorian University in 2022.

== Environment work ==
Protecting the biodiversity and natural resources of Sibuyan Island (known as the Galapagos of Asia) through sustainable programs and social media, Galicha served as executive director of Sibuyan Island Sentinels League for Environment Inc. (Sibuyan ISLE) since 2007. His group, Sibuyanons Against Mining (SAM) successfully campaigned against nickel mining giant BHP Billiton and lobbied for the suspension of mineral extraction of a Canada-based mining company being operated by a Filipino corporation. He also helped the Romblon Ecumenical Forum Against Mining (REFAM) in a successful campaign against a Canada-based mining giant Ivanhoe.

In June 2008, when typhoon Frank hit the Philippines, passenger ship MV Princess of the Stars sank near Sibuyan Island and toxic materials including pesticide endosulfan were feared to contaminate the sea. In a statement with Ecowaste Coalition, Galicha lamented that the possible contamination of Sibuyan Island and its marine environment with endosulfan, tamaron and other chemical cargoes, and bunker fuel from the sunken vessel is already affecting the life and livelihood of our people who depend mainly on the abundance of the sea. Together with various environment organizations affiliated with Ecowaste Coalition, they called for a ban on all uses of endosulfan (and successfully banned by COP5) and return it to its Israel-based manufacturer, and to immediately resolve all problems brought about by the maritime tragedy.

As a young environment conservationist, Galicha sees that:

Threats are challenges. If I yield to threats, fear comes... The risks involved in this advocacy are inevitable. Being an environment advocate is a lifelong commitment. We are all called to discover for ourselves the amazing link of our lives to nature. Unless we are unable to accept that we are part of the totality of nature, we will continue to look at it as a mere subject (for utilization). This we do to learn from the past, address the abuses of the present and pay for our ecological debts for the next.

Engaging with various environmental movements in the Philippines, Galicha became the youngest member of the first Board of Trustees of Green Convergence for Safe Food, Healthy Environment and Sustainable Economy (Green Convergence), one of the country's largest green alliances. He is currently board of trustee member of Greenpeace Philippines and Green Convergence.

== Mt. Guiting-guiting Natural Park ==
Presently leading a local organization in the island, Bayay Sibuyanon Inc. (BSI), Galicha and his colleagues successfully campaigned against the construction of a national road which was intended to traverse Mount Guiting-guiting Natural Park in 2018.

Always vigilant of huge projects which will affect the mountain, listed as one of the declared protected areas in the Philippines, BSI has been reviewing available government documents and academic researches to ensure its protection. In 2020, it was discovered again that some excel files from the Department of Budget and Management show the inclusion of the road project again. This prompted BSI to mobilize an online petition again against the project while engaging with relevant government agencies.

Galicha, representing BSI, sits down as member of the Protected Area Management Board of the natural park.

== Climate advocacy ==
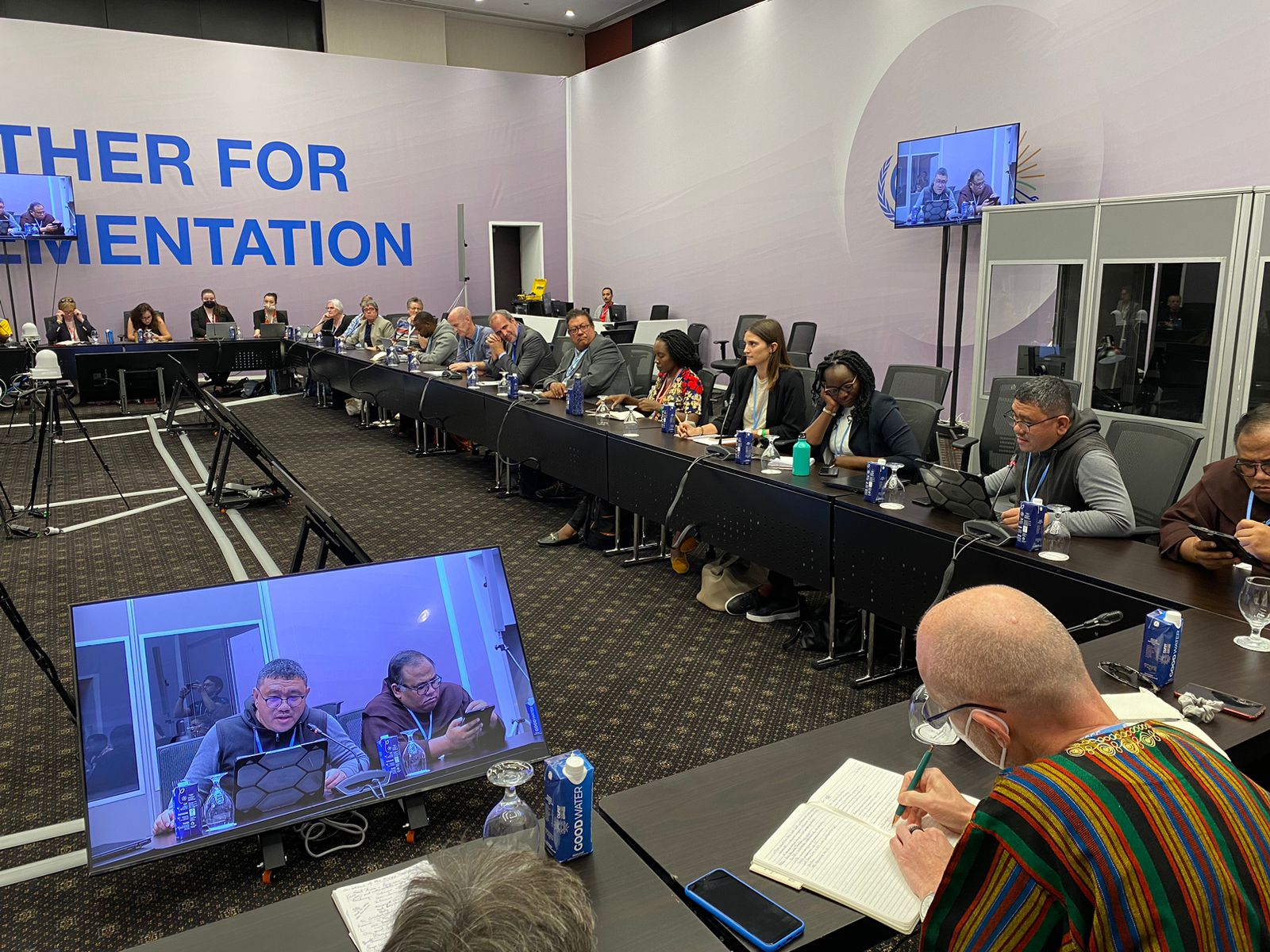
Living Laudato Si' Philippines executive director Rodne Galicha makes a statement on how the Catholic Church and actors engage at the United Nations Framework Convention on Climate Change (UNFCCC) 27th Conference of Parties in Sharm El Sheikh, Egypt.

As climate leader and advocate, Galicha served as Branch Manager for the Philippines of The Climate Reality Project, a global movement founded by Nobel Laureate and former United States Vice President Al Gore. He has been consistently trained in climate science by Mr. Gore and expert scientists of the project in Australia, Indonesia and the United States. Presenting the slideshow developed by experts and Gore himself, he has reached hundreds of thousands in the Philippines and overseas, informing the grassroots about the climate crisis and solutions. In September 2011, he participated in the 24 Hours of Reality online program in New York, USA, as one of the 24 speakers across 24 time zones worldwide. He was watched by about 2.6 million online audience. Recognizing his experience in climate education, he has been chosen to mentor in climate change trainings in Jakarta, Indonesia (2011), California (2012), Chicago (2013), Colorado (2017), USA, Johannesburg, South Africa (2014), Melbourne, Australia (2014), and Manila, Philippines (2016).

When Typhoon Haiyan hit the Philippines, Galicha described the cataclysmic event as climate crime, thus, climate justice must be sought.

Believing that climate action needs to be integrated in Philippine regional development, he has been lobbying for the membership of the Climate Change Commission (CCC) in regional development councils across the country. MIMAROPA Regional Development Council (RDC) successfully confirmed CCC as special non-voting member of the RDC and regular member of the Economic Development Committee.

Since 2020, he has been the Convener of Aksyon Klima Pilipinas, a national network of civil society organizations working on diverse climate and development-related issues. In 2015, he attended the United Nations Framework Convention on Climate Change 21st Conference of Parties (COP21), after joining the Peoples' Pilgrimage delegation who walked form Italy to France. He has engaged in international climate negotiations as one of the technical advisers of the Philippine delegation to COP22 in Morocco and COP23 in Germany, respectively; and as civil society observer for COP24 (Poland), COP25 (Spain), COP26 (United Kingdom), COP27 (Egypt), COP28 (UAE), COP29 (Azerbaijan), and COP30 (Brazil).

== Anti-mining Advocacy ==
On January 23, 2023, when a large international ship anchored in Sibuyan Sea in front of Altai Philippines Mining Corporation (APMC) nickel ore stockpile and port areas at Sitio Bato, Barangay España, San Fernando, Romblon, barangay officials and some environmental defenders started to monitor the development in situ until the next day to keep watch.

On January 24, Galicha formally called on islanders through social media to gather and block the hauling of nickel ores. The Mines and Geosciences Bureau under the Department of Environment and Natural Resources (DENR) granted APMC an exploration permit that includes extraction of 50,000 wet metric tonnes of nickel ore for metallurgical bulk sampling overseas.

Environmental defenders demanded documents such as a foreshore lease agreement and Philippine Ports Authority to construct a private port which APMC failed to present during an informal negotiation facilitated by a Philippine National Police (PNP) officer on January 31, 2023, evening while deploying a full-gear riot police port allegedly to maintain peace and order.

The following day of February 1, the PNP anti-riot force, knowledgeable of the failure of the mining company to present papers, unsuccessfully ushered the mining trucks filled with nickel ore to pass through the human barricade. On the same day, DENR issued a notice of violation (NoV) which was then received by APMC on February 2, 2023. The NoV highlights violations of Presidential Decree 1067 or the Water Code of the Philippines and DENR Department Administrative Order (DAO) 2004-24 for lack of foreshore lease contract.

Another NoV was issued for lack of Environmental Compliance Certificate (ECC) in the construction of a private port, violating Presidential Decree 1586 or the Philippine Environmental Impact Statement System.

In the morning of February 3, 2023, the barricade was broken and PNP's anti-riot force successfully led four trucks to pass through and enter the port area. Two persons were injured. On the same day, a third NoV was issued informing APMC of the lack of special cutting of trees permit violating Presidential Decree 705 or the Revised Forestry Code of the Philippines as amended by Executive Order 277 and further amended by Republic Act 7161.

On February 6, 2023, DENR ordered APMC to cease and desist from utilizing the port, hauling nickel ores from the contract area to the port, suspending ore transport permits and denying the application for miscellaneous lease agreement. The order also includes filing of relevant cases against APMC and an on the ground investigation. Eventually, PPA admitted that the mining company has no permit to construct a private port.

The barricade camp continues until now with the demand to cancel the mineral production sharing agreement (MPSA) of APMC.

Galicha now serves as spokesperson and secretary-general of Save Sibuyan, a consortium of more than twenty-five multi-sectoral local formations, organizations and institutions based in Sibuyan Island.

A Haribon Foundation member, Galicha was involved in Alyansa Tigil Mina (ATM) traveling to different mining-affected communities in the Philippines - exposing the struggles of indigenous peoples and the grassroots, including human rights violations and environmental degradation. He supports the passage of the Alternative Minerals Management Bills pending in the House of Representatives and calls for the repeal of the Mining Act of 1995.

Galicha was actively involved in the Save Palawan Movement aiming to save the Philippine's last ecological frontier, Palawan, from mining destruction. The movement has already gathered more than seven million signatures to halt mining in Palawan and other key biodiversity areas in the country, critical watersheds, agricultural areas, tourism sites and island ecosystems, among others.

== 10Rs ==
For sustainable living, Galicha developed and promoted the 10Rs (starting with the 3Rs) which can simply be done at home and in communities: reduce, reuse, recycle, repair, refuse, rethink, rainforest, regenerate, recollect and respect.

Galicha has been invited to talk about youth empowerment, environmental sustainability, climate change, human rights and ecology in various events in countries in Africa, Australia, Europe, Asia, South America and the United States. He blogs at http://rodgalicha.com.
