= Deforestation in the Philippines =

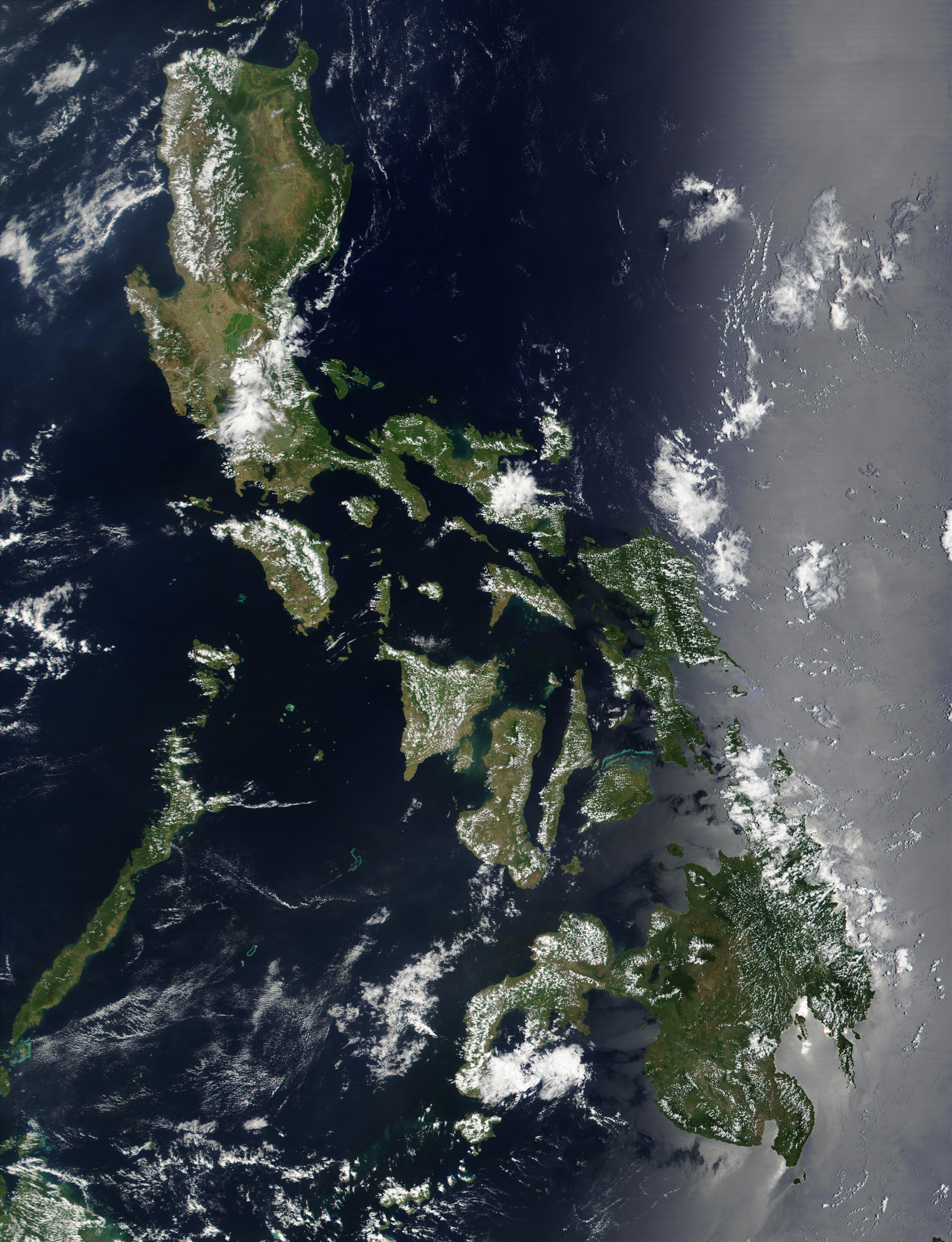
Satellite image of the Philippines in March 2002 showing forest cover in dark green

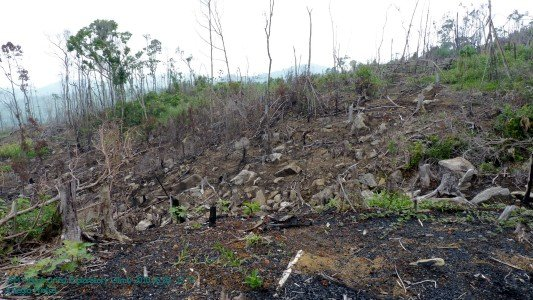
Small-scale logging and coal-making operations at the lower areas of the Sierra Madre mountain range

As in other Southeast Asian countries, deforestation in the Philippines is a major environmental issue. Over the course of the 20th century, the forest cover of the country dropped from 70 percent down to 20 percent. A 2010 land cover mapping by the National Mapping and Resource Information Authority revealed that the total forest cover of the Philippines is 6,839,718 hectares (68,397.18 km^{2}) or 23% of the country's total area of 30,000,000 hectares (300,000 km^{2}). Rapid population growth, unregulated logging concessions especially during Ferdinand Marcos' regime, illegal logging and mining, and destructive typhoons have been cited as major reasons for deforestation in the country.

Deforestation affects biodiversity in the Philippines and has long-term negative impacts on the country's food production. Deforestation in the country has also been associated with floods, soil erosion, deaths, and damage to property.

To combat deforestation, the Philippine government has made efforts to preserve and restore forests through reforestation projects such as the National Greening Program. Legislation to protect existing forests have also been proposed and enacted, while non-governmental organizations, Indigenous communities, and the private sector conduct tree-planting activities in various parts of the country.

== History ==
=== Colonial era deforestation ===
Spain established a forestry service in the Philippines in the 1860s. The staff of the forestry service including Sebastián Vidal researched the flora of the Philippines, particularly woody plants. However, data on forestry before 1946 has been sparse, reportedly due to an 1897 fire and World War II that destroyed Spanish and American records respectively. Around 90% of the Philippines, which had a population of less than a million, was forested in the 16th century during the early years of Spanish colonization. By the early era of the American colonization in 1903, this figure declined to 70% as the country's population grew to 7.6 million. After the Japanese occupation and World War II in 1950, forest cover in the country further declined to 50%, with the country's population increasing to 20 million.

Forest clearing was notable in the Visayas, particularly in the islands of Negros, Bohol and Cebu, where much of the forest cover had already been lost. Agricultural expansion continued throughout the 20th century.

Indigenous peoples, such as the such as the Yapayao and Isneg peoples who used to live in the Ilocos Region, were slowly pushed into living in the sparsely populated but resource-rich mountains, which would expose them to conflicts with developers in later eras, particularly during Martial Law under Ferdinand Marcos.

=== Deforestation during the martial law era ===
The 1960s and 1970s saw a boom in the logging industry, with the industry reaching its peak during the era of 10th president Ferdinand Marcos.

Under Marcos, logging took on an increasingly central role in the Philippine economy. Following the declaration of martial law in 1972, Marcos handed out concessions to large tracts of land to his senior military officials, cronies, and relatives. The government encouraged log exportation to Japan resulting from soaring wood demand during Japan's period of rapid economic growth, and pressure to pay foreign debt. Forests resources were exploited by set-up companies and reforestation was rarely undertaken. Japanese log traders purchased massive quantities of cheap logs from unsustainable sources, accelerating deforestation. Log production increased from 6.3 million cubic metres (220×10^{6} cu ft) in 1960 to an average of 10.5 million cubic metres (370×10^{6} cu ft) between 1968 and 1975, peaking at over 15 million cubic metres (530×10^{6} cu ft) in 1975, before declining to about 4 million cubic metres (140×10^{6} cu ft) in 1987. The 1970s and 1980s saw an average of 2.5% of Philippine forests disappearing every year, which was thrice the worldwide deforestation rate.

=== Deforestation after 1986 ===
Deforestation remained very high during the Corazon Aquino and Fidel V. Ramos administrations despite tree planting efforts due to corruption and inefficiency in the government agencies involved.

According to Global Forest Watch, from 2001 to 2020, most of the loss of forest cover in the Philippines took place in Palawan. Other provinces that have lost significant forest cover are Agusan del Sur, Zamboanga del Norte, Davao Oriental, and Quezon Province.

== Causes ==
According to the World Research Institute's review on global forests, there is an estimated 4.1 million hectares (Mha) drop in forest in the year 2022. This resulted in 2.7 billion tons of carbon dioxide emissions, making it equal to the yearly emissions in India. Moreover, based on the global Forest Watch's current data, the years 2001 to 2024 have lost 520 million hectares of trees, resulting in a 13% decline in global tree cover, leading to 220 billion tons of carbon dioxide emissions.

Similarly, a total of 1.42 million hectares of trees vanished in the Philippines from 2001 to 2022. Mainly due to urbanization in cities and provinces. It reflects the 7.6% decline in the country’s overall tree cover of roughly 18.684 million hectares, which also adds to 848 metric tons of carbon dioxide emissions.

Based on the 2022 Philippine Forestry Statistics, the Philippines has over 7.22 million hectares of forest or 24.07% of the country’s land mass. This is significantly lower than the 17.8 million hectares of forest recorded in 1934.

=== Government policies ===
According to scholar Jessica Mathews, short-sighted policies by the Filipino government have contributed to the high rate of deforestation:

The government regularly granted logging concessions of less than ten years. Since it takes 30–35 years for a second-growth forest to mature, loggers had no incentive to replant. Compounding the error, flat royalties encouraged the loggers to remove only the most valuable species. A horrendous 40 percent of the harvestable lumber never left the forests, but, having been damaged in the logging, rotted or was burned in place. The unsurprising result of these and related policies is that out of 17 million hectares of closed forests that flourished early in the century, only 1.2 million remain today.

Attribution of deforestation to population pressure or agricultural expansion was found not to be backed by existing evidence in a 1992 study. Subsequent research has shown that intensification of existing farmers and improved off-farm income reduced forest pressure. However, in some parts of the country forest encroachment still happens due to high demand for vegetables.

=== Mining and logging ===
Mining and logging are major causes of deforestation in the Philippines. Mining operations have cleared large areas of forest land and has led to water contamination, ecological destruction, loss of livelihood, and loss of biodiversity.

Republic Act 7942, or the Philippine Mining Act, allows mining operations to clear trees and relocate Indigenous and local communities. The law allows foreign-owned companies to engage in mining activities. According to environmental group Alyansa Tigil Mina, the law "legitimizes the plunder of our national patrimony," and that the "situation will only worsen if ChaCha prospers and transnational corporations are allowed to act with impunity."

Illegal logging occurs in the Philippines and intensifies flood damage in some areas. Deforestation caused by mining or logging has been linked to such environmental disasters as the Ormoc tragedy and the Ondoy disaster.

During the flood control corruption scandal, environmental groups pushed for the passage of an anti-dynasty law as well as a law requiring firms to disclose contracts and beneficial owners, noting links between political dynasties and mining companies. Alyansa Tigil Mina said that mining companies will break environmental laws when these firms are owned by politicians.

=== Land conversion ===
Deforestation is also caused by land conversion for corporate agriculture, cash crops, real estate, and infrastructure. IBON Foundation cites as an example the one million hectares allocated for palm oil plantations in Mindanao, as well as Build, Build, Build infrastructure projects that will destroy forests, water sources, farms, and livelihoods, and displace local communities.

=== Natural disasters ===
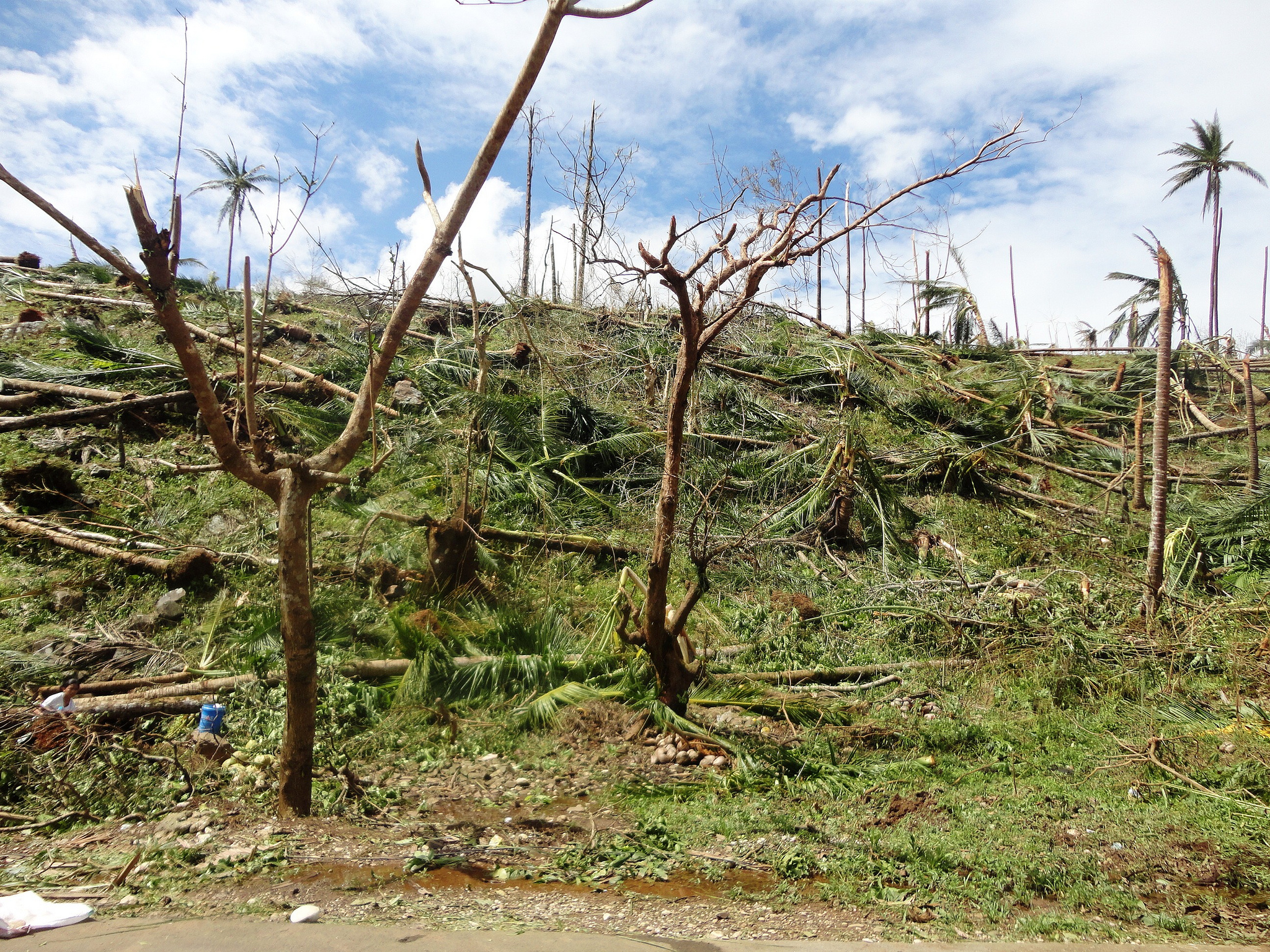
Coconut trees destroyed by Typhoon Bopha in Boston, Davao Oriental in 2012

Destructive typhoons in the Philippines, such as Typhoon Haiyan (Yolanda) in 2013, also cause deforestation and defoliation.

== Tree cover extent and loss ==
Global Forest Watch publishes annual estimates of tree cover loss and 2000 tree cover extent derived from time-series analysis of Landsat satellite imagery in the Global Forest Change dataset. In this framework, tree cover refers to vegetation taller than 5 m (including natural forests and tree plantations), and tree cover loss is defined as the complete removal of tree cover canopy for a given year, regardless of cause.

For the Philippines, country statistics report cumulative tree cover loss of 1,524,278 ha (15,242.78 km^{2}) from 2001 to 2024 (about 8.2% of its 2000 tree cover area). For tree cover density greater than 30%, country statistics report a 2000 tree cover extent of 18,599,368 ha (185,993.68 km^{2}). The charts and table below display this data. In simple terms, the annual loss number is the area where tree cover disappeared in that year, and the extent number shows what remains of the 2000 tree cover baseline after subtracting cumulative loss. Forest regrowth is not included in the dataset.

Annual tree cover loss in the Philippines, 2001–2024. View chart definition.
Tree cover extent in 2000 minus cumulative tree cover loss in the Philippines, 2001–2024 (loss-only residual; does not account for gain). View chart definition.

Annual tree cover extent and loss
Year	Tree cover extent (km2) (Note: This residual measure does not include forest regrowth.)	Annual tree cover loss (km2)
2001	185,642.02	351.66
2002	185,318.93	323.09
2003	184,967.38	351.55
2004	184,481.59	485.79
2005	183,983.77	497.82
2006	183,409.49	574.28
2007	182,744.52	664.97
2008	182,357.49	387.03
2009	181,748.60	608.89
2010	180,722.11	1,026.49
2011	180,389.58	332.53
2012	179,793.71	595.87
2013	179,204.99	588.72
2014	178,180.43	1,024.56
2015	177,521.46	658.97
2016	176,230.37	1,291.09
2017	175,087.58	1,142.79
2018	174,382.25	705.33
2019	173,741.88	640.37
2020	173,104.61	637.27
2021	172,615.78	488.83
2022	171,770.35	845.43
2023	171,342.99	427.36
2024	170,750.90	592.09

== Conservation ==
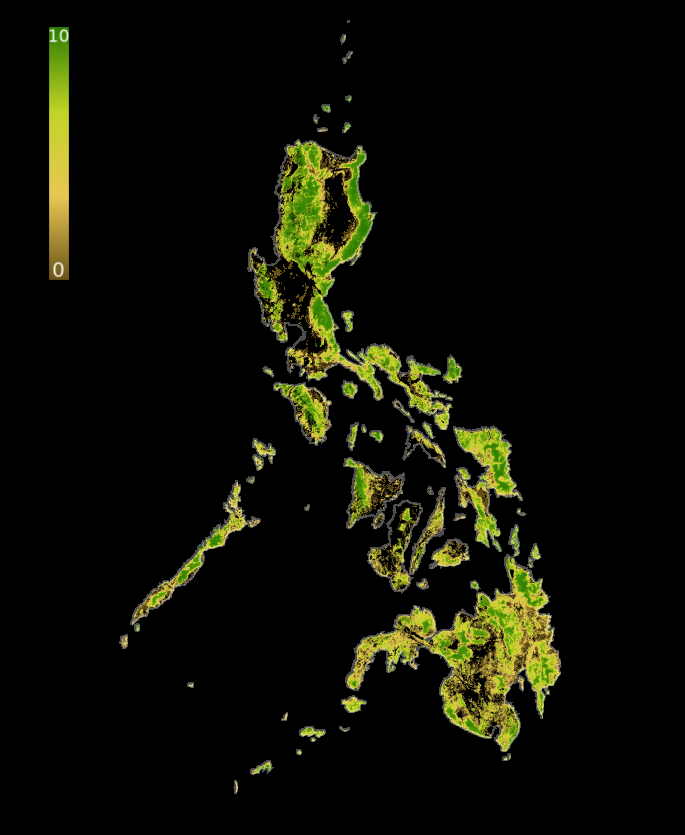
Forest Landscape Integrity Index 2019 map of the Philippines

The Philippine national REDD+ Strategy, which aims to reduce greenhouse gas emissions from deforestation, was drafted and submitted to the United Nations in 2010. An update to the strategy published by the Forest and Management Bureau of the Philippines showed that as of 2017, the county was still in the early phase of preparing to implement its REDD+ Strategy.

Executive Order 23 was signed in February 2011 banning logging throughout the country.

New mining agreements were banned in 2012 to protect the environment, though existing mines were allowed to continue operations.

A nationwide ban on open-pit mining was put in place in 2017. Department of Environment and Natural Resources (DENR) Secretary Gina Lopez suspended permits for 26 mining operations that violated environmental rules. However, the ban on open-pit and other mining operations was lifted in 2021.

In response to these environmental challenges, the Department of Environment and Natural Resources (DENR) has listed a number of different plant species that can be planted nationwide to promote urban greening and reforestation. According to the Philippine Guidebook on Plant Species Suitable for Urban Greening, these include native species such as Pakpak-Lauin (Bird’s Nest Fern), Anahaw, Manila Palm, Kapa-kapa, and others. In addition, some non-native species can also be planted because of local adaptation and no longer possess invasive characteristics that negatively affect human well-being and property. Native and non-native plants are recommended for their capability to adapt to local conditions, contribute to biodiversity, and support ecological restoration.

=== Reforestation ===
==== Government policies ====
In June 1977, President Ferdinand Marcos signed a law requiring the planting of one tree every month for five consecutive years by every citizen of the Philippines. The law was repealed by President Corazon Aquino in July 1987, through Executive Order 287, which states that the planting of trees "can be achieved without the compulsion and the penalties for non-compliance therewith as set forth in the Decree".

President Benigno Aquino III established the National Greening Program (NGP) with the signing of Executive Order No. 26 on February 24, 2011. The program aims to increase the country's forest cover in 1.5 million hectares (15,000 km^{2}) of land with 1.5 billion trees from 2011 to 2016. In 2015, the program was expanded to cover all remaining unproductive, denuded and degraded forestlands and its period of implementation extended from 2016 to 2028.

In September 2012, President Benigno Aquino III signed a law requiring all able-bodied citizens of the Philippines, who are at least 12 years of age, to plant one tree every year. There is no provision in the law to enforce and monitor compliance to this requirement.

In June 2020, the DENR started allowing a "family approach" under the National Greening Program, permitting families to establish forest plantations composed of timber and non-timber species, which include bamboo and rattan.

==== Tree planting activities ====
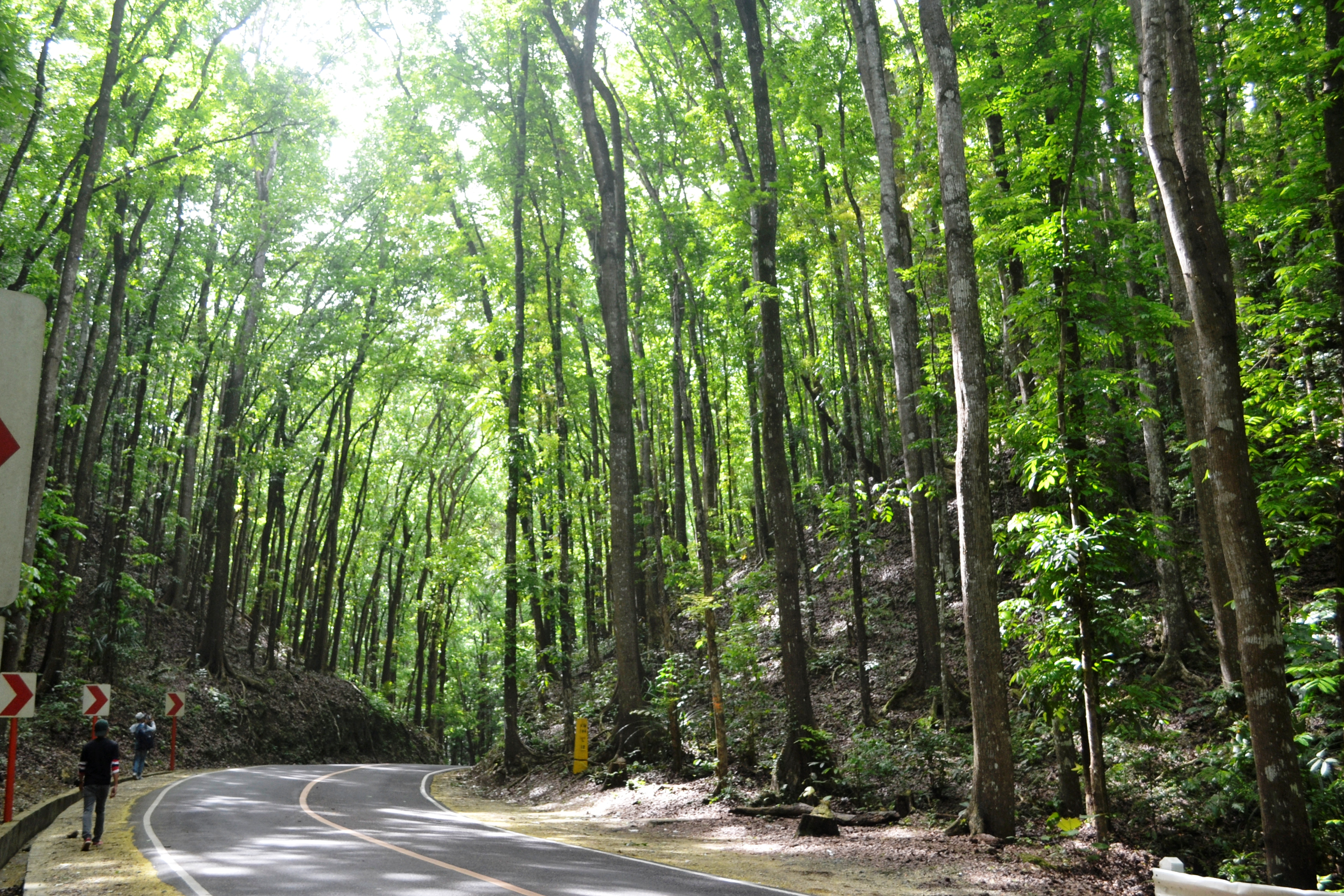
Man-made mahogany forest in Bilar, Bohol

There are tree-planting initiatives conducted in various parts of the country. On March 8, 2012, 1,009,029 mangrove trees were planted within one hour by a team achieved by the joint efforts of Governor Lray Villafuerte of the El Verde Movement and the people of San Rafael of Ragay, Camarines Sur.

On September 26, 2014, the Philippines broke the Guinness World Record for the "Most trees planted simultaneously (multiple locations)", wherein 2,294,629 trees were planted in 29 locations throughout the country by 122,168 participants in an event organized by TreeVolution: Greening MindaNOW (Philippines). Trees planted during the event included rubber, cacao, coffee, timber, mahogany trees, as well as various fruit trees and other species native to the country.

=== Proposed legislation ===
In May 2019, the House of Representatives of the Philippines has approved House Bill 8728, or the "Graduation Legacy for the Environment Act," principally authored by Magdalo Party-List Representative Gary Alejano and Cavite 2nd District Representative Strike Revilla, requiring all graduating elementary, high school, and college students to plant at least 10 trees each before they can graduate. A similar Senate bill was filed but not passed.

House Bill 5240, or the National Land Use Act, and House Bill 9088, or the Sustainable Forest Management Act, were approved in the House of Representatives to address deforestation, land use conversion, and other environmental issues. The counterpart bills in the Senate stalled in the committee on the environment, headed by Senator Cynthia Villar, whose family owns residential land development corporations in the Philippines. Environmental advocacy group Haribon said the Villar family's business interests create a conflict of interest.

Environmental groups have called for a review the Philippine Mining Act, the Fisheries Code, the Comprehensive Land Use Plan, and the Expanded National Integrated Protected Areas System Act to ensure responsible environmental and natural resources management. Environmental groups have also called for the passage of a People's Mining Law and an Environmental Defender's Law.

== REDD+ reference level and forest monitoring ==
The Philippines has submitted a national forest reference level (FRL) under the UNFCCC REDD+ framework. The UNFCCC REDD+ web platform lists the Philippines’ 2023 FRL as “assessed”; on the same portal, entries for a national REDD+ strategy, safeguards information and a forest monitoring system are marked as unreported.

In its 2023 submission (and modified submission used in the technical assessment), the Philippines’ FRL covers “reducing emissions from deforestation” and “enhancement of forest carbon stocks” (reported as net emissions from deforestation and gross removals from reforestation) for the historical reference period 2000–2018. The assessed FRL is expressed as a single annual average of 13,507,350 t CO2 eq per year. The technical assessment notes that the FRL accounts for CO2 only and includes above-ground and below-ground biomass pools, while excluding deadwood, litter and soil organic matter. The modified submission reported a combined uncertainty of 27% (95% confidence interval) for the national total.

The submission adopts the national definition of forest (land >0.5 ha with trees higher than 5 m and canopy cover >10%) and defines deforestation as human-induced conversion of forest to another land use or long-term reduction of canopy cover below the 10% threshold. Activity data for forest change were derived from a remote-sensing time series (including TerraPulse forest-cover products) and emission factors from the national Forest Resources Assessment (2013–2019). The modified submission also describes the FRL methods as part of the Philippines’ national forest monitoring system, noting guidelines have been provided to operationalize an NFMS (including a satellite land monitoring system, periodic activity-data generation, a national forest inventory, and a forest information system/web portal).

== Activism ==
Local governments, Indigenous communities, and nongovernmental organizations conduct campaigns against destructive practices such as logging and mining. Organizations include Alyansa Tigil Mina and Kalikasan People's Network for the Environment.

=== Threats to environmentalists ===
The killing of environmental activists has been allegedly linked to mining companies. According to human rights group Global Witness, a third of land defenders killed in the Philippines from 2012 to 2024 are anti-mining activists.

== See also ==
- Environmental issues in the Philippines
- Luzon rainforest
- Oposa v. Factoran
