= Sibuyan Island =

Island in the Philippines

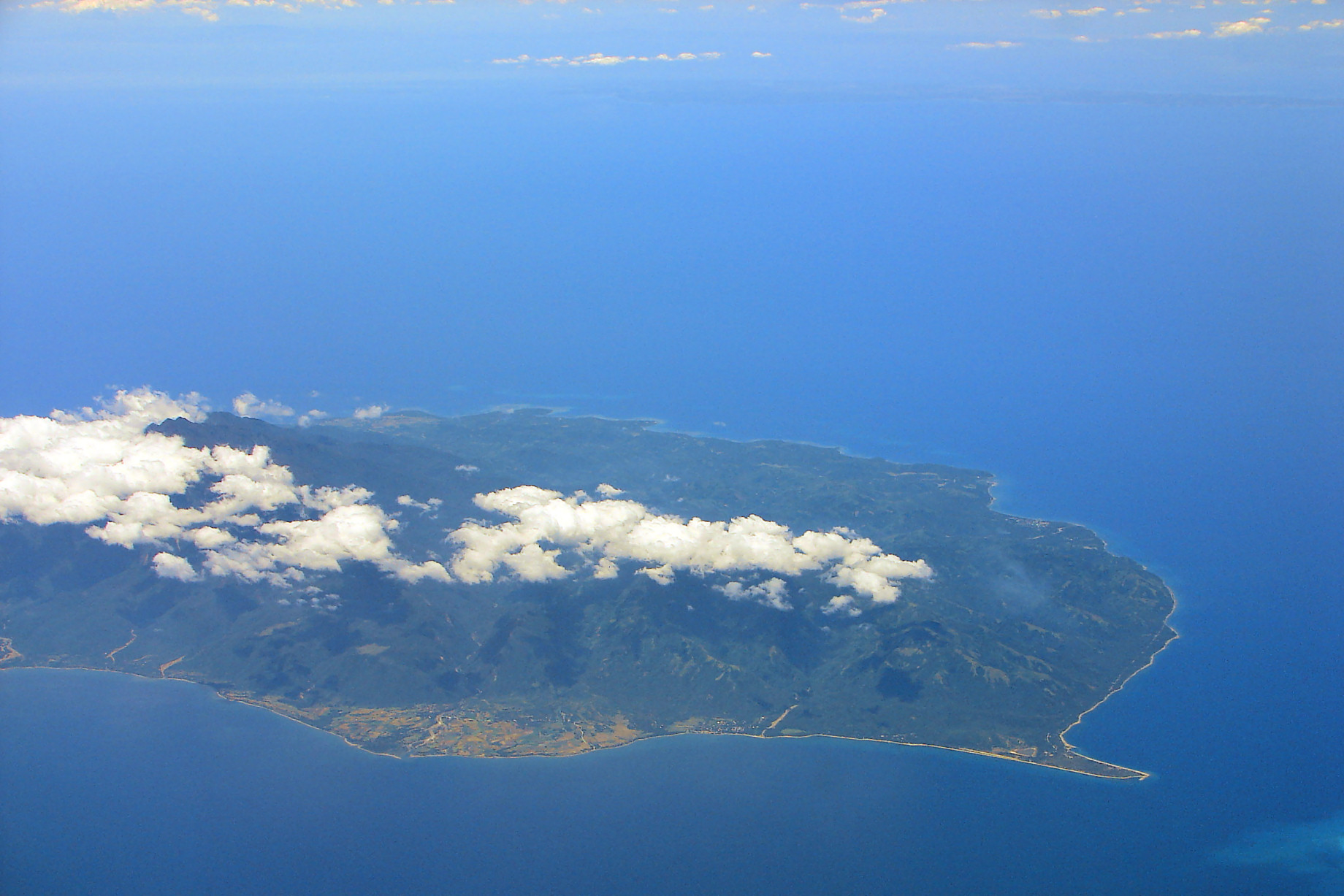
- Aerial view of the island

- Location within Philippines

Geography
- Location: Sibuyan Sea
- Coordinates: 12°23′8″N 122°33′41″E
- Archipelago: Romblon Group of Islands
- Area: 445 km^{2} (172 sq mi)
- Highest elevation: 2,058 m (6752 ft)
- Highest point: Mount Guiting-Guiting

Administration
- Philippines
- Region: Mimaropa
- Province: Romblon
- Municipalities: Cajidiocan; Magdiwang; San Fernando
- Largest settlement: San Fernando (pop. 24,171)

Demographics
- Population: 62,815 (2020)
- Pop. density: 118.2/km^{2} (306.1/sq mi)
- Ethnic groups: Sibuyanon (Romblomanon)

Additional information

Sibuyan is a crescent-shaped island, the second largest in an archipelago comprising Romblon Province, Philippines. Located in the namesake Sibuyan Sea, it has an area of 445 square kilometres (172 sq mi) and has a total population of 62,815, as of the 2020 census. The island has two prominent peaks, the highest is Mount Guiting-Guiting, with an elevation of 2,058 metres (6,752 ft), followed by Mount Nailog, which is 789 metres (2,589 ft) high. The people speak the Sibuyanon dialect of Romblomanon, a Visayan language.

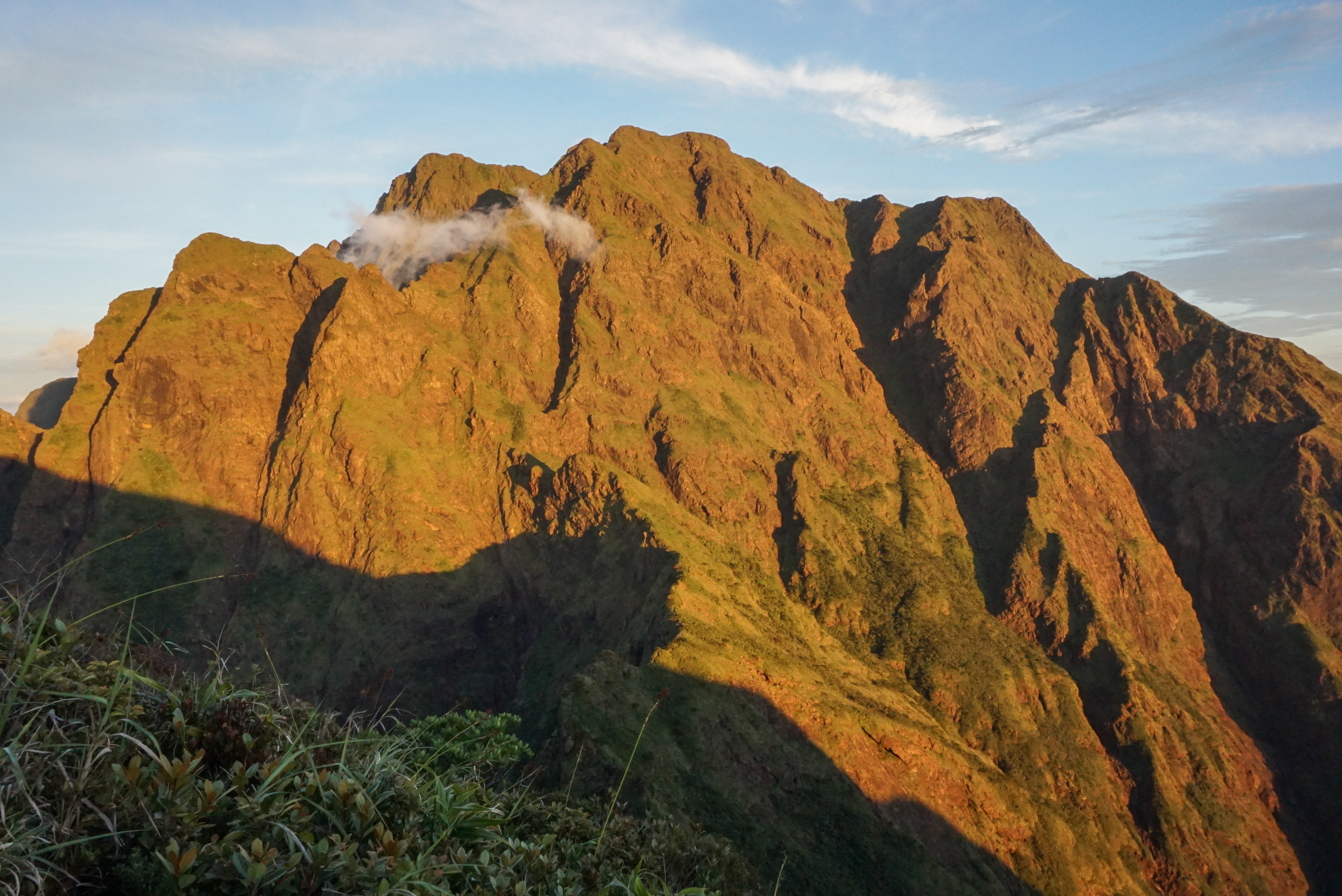
Mount Guiting-Guiting summit, as seen from Mayo's Peak, the highest mountain in the province of Romblon.

Sibuyan has been dubbed by some local and international natural scientists as "the Galápagos of Asia", because it has remained in isolation from the rest of the world since its formation. Never in its geological history has it ever been connected with any part of the Philippine archipelago. Seismic forces pushed up a 2,000 metres (6,600 ft) peak from the Earth's crust, forming a series of smaller peaks and slopes. The peak is Mount Guiting-Guiting (literally means "the saw-toothed mountain", in reference to its jagged ridge). Because of the steep slopes, much of its original forest remains untouched, and the rest is the island as we find it today.

Primary forests cover 140 square kilometres (54 sq mi), which is 33% of the land area of Sibuyan. However, most of the lower altitude forest has been logged or is secondary. Mount Guiting-guiting Natural Park (equivalent to the IUCN category of National Park) was established to protect these forests, which are mainly in the centre and north of the island, and covers an area of 157 square kilometres (61 sq mi) out of Sibuyan's total area of 445 square kilometres (172 sq mi). The park features a scenic landscape with twin towering peaks set amidst closed canopy forests. Its forests remain largely intact, and include the entire elevational gradient from lowland dipterocarp forest (at 200 to 900 m) and mangroves, through montane forest (above 700 m) to mossy forest, heathland and montane grassland around the peaks.

== Political subdivision ==
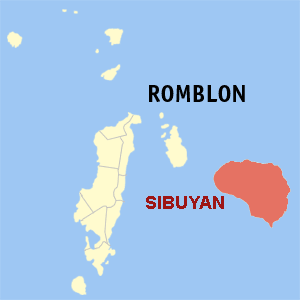
Romblon province map locating Sibuyan island

The island is divided into three municipalities: Cajidiocan, Magdiwang, and San Fernando.

== Biodiversity ==
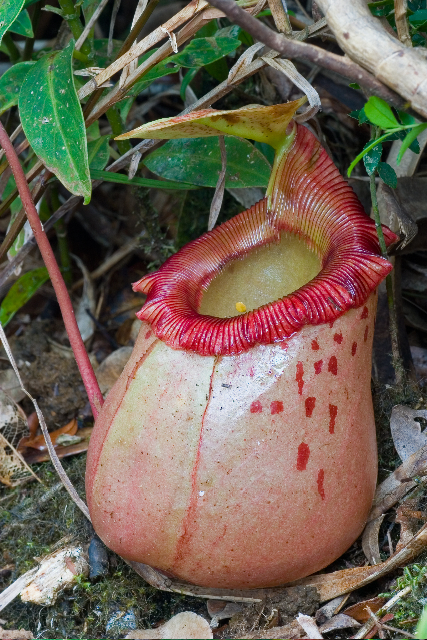
Nepenthes sibuyanensis from Mount Guiting-Guiting

Sibuyan has a rich biodiversity of flora and fauna. Exact figures on numbers of total plant species are hard to give, as biologists stumble upon species yet unidentified by the scientific community. In one study, the National Museum identified 1,551 trees in a single hectare, with 123 species of trees, and of this number, 54 are found nowhere else in the world. Hence, it has been proclaimed as one of the world's most diverse and dense forests. There are estimated to be 700 vascular plant species on the island. Nepenthes sibuyanensis, a pitcher plant species, is also endemic as its scientific name suggests. There are 131 species of birds and ten species of fruit bats, and many dwelling mammals, reptiles, and rodents yet to be fully catalogued. Three birds subspecies are endemic to Sibuyan: the Philippine hanging parrot (Loriculus philippensis bournsi), the Philippine pygmy-woodpecker (Dendrocopos maculatus menagei), and the Orange-bellied flowerpecker (Dicaeum trigonostigma sibuyanicum), all of which were recorded there in the early 1990s. Five species of threatened mammals, one fruit bat and four rodents, are endemic to Sibuyan, and the endangered Philippine tube-nosed fruit bat (Nyctimene rabori) occurs there.

=== An unspoiled ecosystem ===
Sibuyan Island has been said to be one of the most unspoiled ecosystems in the Philippines and the world. The water of the Cantingas River as well as most of the other smaller rivers and rivulets on the island was tested to be one of the best water quality for human consumption worldwide. The drinking water of Sibuyanons come direct and untreated from rivers, springs and holes drilled at mountain slopes or from the ground.

=== Mammals ===
The Sibuyan striped shrew-rat (Chrotomys sibuyanensis) is a species of rodents in the Muridae family endemic to Sibuyan.

The Sibuyan white-toothed shrew (Crocidura ninoyi) is a species of shrew in the Soricidae family endemic to Sibuyan.

== Mining activities ==
Mining operations in Sibuyan have started since 2005, when a barangay of San Fernando endorsed mining projects in their area, believing that this will create jobs for residents, although exploration of the area began as early as 1972. On October 3, 2007, Romblon town councilor Armin Marin was shot dead during an anti-mining protest against the operations of mining company Sibuyan Nickel Properties Development Corp. when a confrontation erupted between protesters and the firm's security guards.

The Sibuyanons Against Mining advocacy group, with the Sibuyan Island Sentinels League for Environment Inc. (Sibuyan ISLE) has been fighting for the conservation and protection of the island against mining activities considering its vast impact on the ecology, culture and society of the island.

=== 2023 Altai Philippines Mining Corporation protest ===
In December 2022, the government issued a mineral ore export permit to the Altai Philippines Mining Corporation (APMC), allowing the company to bulk test 50,000 metric tons of ore. In January 2023, Sibuyan residents set up a barricade to protest APMC operations, saying the extraction of nickel ore will disrupt the island's intact ecosystems. On February 3, 2023, according to the environmental advocacy organization Alyansa Tigil Mina (ATM), protesters formed a human barricade intended to stop APMC trucks carrying nickel ore from leaving the San Fernando port, but the trucks forced their way through the barricade. This prompted 30 policemen to intervene and disperse the residents.

On February 4, the Department of Environment and Natural Resources (DENR) served a notice to APMC stating that the company was found to be "constructing/operating a causeway project without an approved environmental compliance certificate". Two days later the company has voluntarily stopped all exploration and testing activities in the area, stating that they are committed to maintaining the "highest standards of environmental responsibility and community engagement". On February 8, DENR ordered a probe to conduct an investigation into the alleged damage of seagrass and other marine resources due to AMPC operations, and to take legal action for reportedly cutting trees without the necessary permit.

In a statement on February 10, the company said that it was "peacefully exercising its rights" under a 2009 agreement with DENR, and has appealed for due process, claiming it has been "maligned, unfairly judged, and prevented from performing its lawful activities".

=== 2026 Altai mining controversy and councilor betrayal ===
In July 2026, six councilors of San Fernando controversially voted in favor of a large-scale mining operation in Sibuyan island, leading to massive criticism nationwide. The approved Declaration of Mining Project Feasibility (DMPF) and mining operation application was for Altai Philippines Mining Corporation (APMC), owned by William Gatchalian, known for mining ventures that have destroyed livelihood and thousands of hectares of forests, seas, and farmlands throughout the Philippines. The six councilors who voted in favor of mining were Rene Baranda, Jezrel Aquino, Marcial Riano, Cynthia Rios, Dinggol Marin and IPMR (Indigenous Peoples Mandatory Representative) Celedonio Tamayo. All of the councilors were against mining before they were elected into office, but changed sides after being elected. Various groups, including indigenous groups, rallied towards the houses of the said councilors, demanding the councilors to revoke their votes and branding the councilors as traitors of Sibuyan. Only three councilors voted against mining, namely Daxie Benedict Rios, Marites Clavel, and Cedmarc Francis Renion, while two others were absent during the voting session. Various destructive mining companies have attempted to mine Sibuyan island, known as the Galapagos of Asia for its rich biological diversity and ecosystems, since 1972. Each generation of Sibuyan residents have consistently and continuously defended their ancestral homeland against mining companies that have killed numerous environmental Sibuyan heroes and defenders for decades.

== Other events ==
On June 21, 2008, the passenger ferry MV Princess of the Stars of Sulpicio Lines (now Philippine Span Asia Carrier Corp.) capsized off the coast of the island in the height of Typhoon Frank. Of the 851 passengers, only 32 survived.
