= Sibuyanons Against Mining =

Filipino environmental advocacy group

Sibuyanons Against Mining (SAM) is an environmental advocacy group organized primarily by Sibuyanons. It has been fighting for mining moratorium in Sibuyan Island (Philippines). It aims to protect the island, which has the world's densest forest, the Philippine's cleanest river and Mount Guiting-Guiting, from future environmental degradation and exploitation.

== History ==
SAM was primarily an online advocacy created in February 2006 and formed formally on July 2, 2006 in Intramuros, Manila. From then on, it helped organize the creation of a worldwide environmental advocacy campaign against mining operations in Sibuyan Island.

== Advocacy ==
SAM adheres to responsible stewardship. Mining in the island is not sustainable because the island-people live by the island's bounties. Endemism and biodiversity are major factors why SAM is also looking for mining moratorium in the island since it is a center of endemism and critical plant site. They 'think that exploration could destroy the environment, the ecological balance, particularly the Mount Guiting-Guiting, which means posing a threat to the human beings of the area.'

On September 2, 2006, almost 8,000 people (first in the history of Romblon province) gathered in front of a mining site to express their environmental concern. The mobilization was realized in collaboration with the sambuligan or basic ecclesial communities of the Immaculate Conception Shrine Parish of San Fernando, Romblon, and the Vicariate of Sibuyan.

== Network ==
The advocacy is now worldwide through its online petition and local and international environmental organizations' support. SAM is also a member of the Philippine's alliance against mining, Alyansa Tigil Mina.
