= Mount Nailog =

Mountain in the Philippines

- Location within Philippines

Highest point
- Coordinates: 12°26′33″N 122°30′33″E

Geography
- Location: Sibuyan Island
- Country: Philippines
- Region: Mimaropa
- Province: Romblon

Mount Nailog is one of the two prominent peaks of Sibuyan Island, Philippines with a height of 789 metres (2,589 ft) and a topographic prominence of 464 metres (1,522 ft). The highest peak on the island is Mount Guiting-Guiting, with an elevation of 2,037 metres (6,683 ft).

== See also ==
- List of mountains in the Philippines
