= Mount Guiting-Guiting =

Mountain in Romblon, Philippines

Mount Guiting‑Guiting
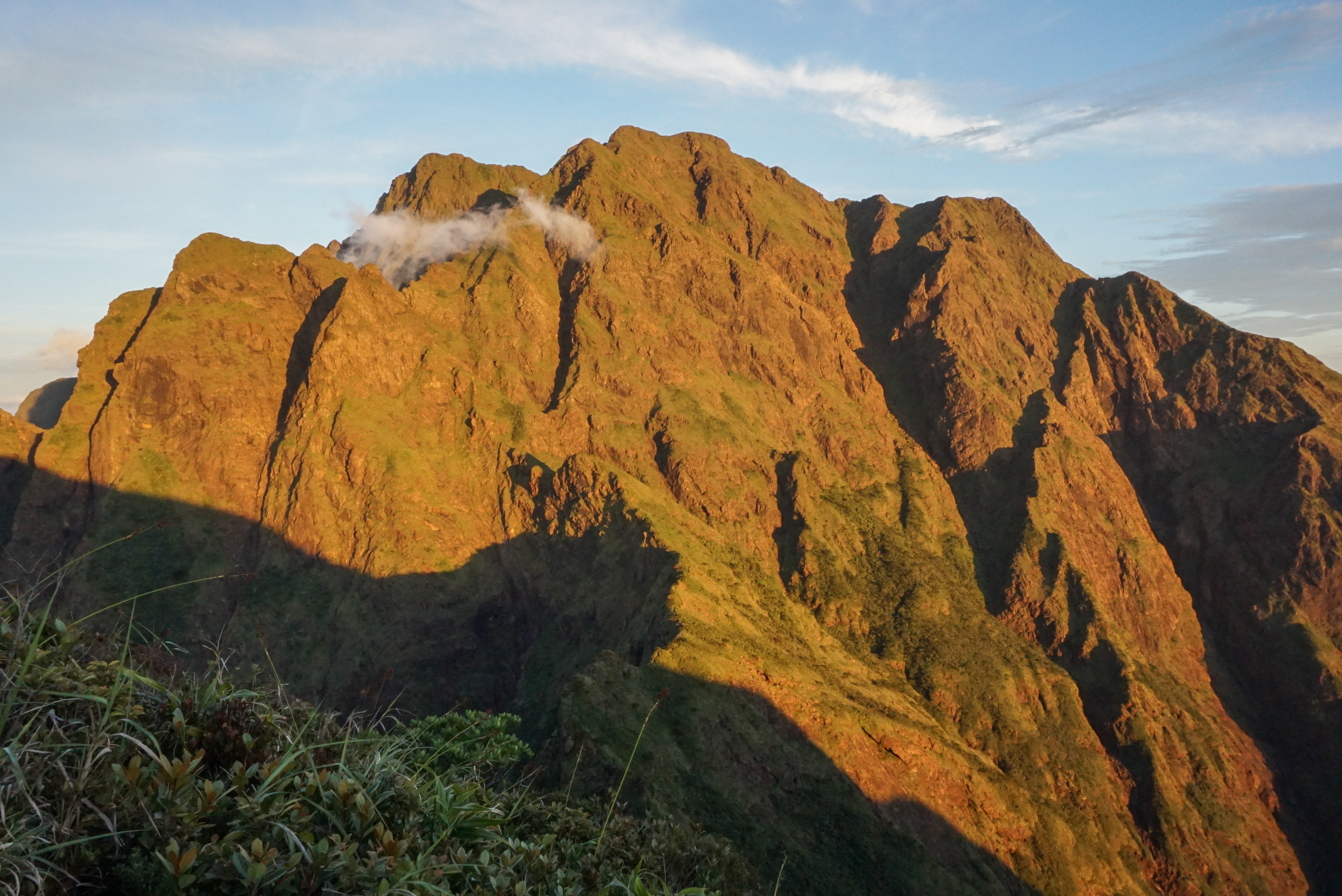
- Summit of Mount Guiting-Guiting as seen from Mayo's Peak. The narrow ridge connecting the two in the foreground is known as the Knife Edge Trail.

Highest point
- Elevation: 2,058 m (6,752 ft)
- Prominence: 2,058 m (6,752 ft)
- Listing: 1st-highest mountain in Romblon; 11th-most prominent mountain in the Philippines; 71st-highest peak of an island in the world; Ultra prominent peak; Ribu
- Coordinates: 12°24′50″N 122°34′04″E

Naming
- English translation: jagged
- Language of name: Romblomanon

Geography
- Location within Luzon Location within Philippines
- Country: Philippines
- Region: Mimaropa
- Province: Romblon

Climbing
- First ascent: 1982 - Expedition organized by Arturo Valdez and Company.
- Easiest route: Tampayan Trail, Olango Trail

Mount Guiting-Guiting is the highest mountain in the province of Romblon, located in Sibuyan Island, in the Philippines, with an elevation of 6,752 ft (2,058 m) above sea level. Its steep slopes and jagged peak, have earned it a reputation as one of the most technically challenging mountains to climb in the Philippines. It is ranked as the 11th-most prominent mountain in the Philippines, and 71st-highest peak of an island in the world. Located at the heart of Sibuyan, it dominates the landscape for miles around. Guiting-Guiting, in the Romblomanon dialect means "jagged". It is one of the focal points of Sibuyan's declaration as a biodiversity haven and has been dubbed by some local and international natural scientists as The Galapagos of Asia. The island of Sibuyan has often been compared with the biodiversity endemism rate of the Galápagos Islands in Ecuador. This high endemism prompted much of the mountain and its slopes to be protected in 1996 as the Mt. Guiting-Guiting Natural Park. The park also encompasses the nearby 789-metre (2,589-ft) high Mount Nailog to the west.

== Hiking ==
Guiting-Guiting is often referred to as Mount G2, although the nickname is not accepted by the locals as it disrespects the indigenous name of the sacred site. The mountain is open all year round for hiking, with two established trails; the Tampayan Trail from the north, and the Olango Trail from the south. Hiking permits and guides are secured from the DENR office in Magdiwang town. The entire upper trails consist of exposed, broken, and sharp ultramafic rocks and boulders. The summit area of Mount Guiting-Guiting is primarily a heath land and grassland with exposed rocks on the serrated ridges of the peak.

Though the length and duration of the climb is relatively short, from one to three days depending on experience and trail difficulty, this mountain is still acknowledged as one of the most difficult and technically challenging Philippine mountain to climb, with 9/9 difficulty. (Note: The level of difficulty of a trek is gauged from 1 to 9 In the Filipino mountaineering community.)

=== History ===
In May 1982, under the leadership of Arturo Valdez, a joint team from the Bacolod-based Philippine Mountaineering Society (PMS) and the University of the Philippines (UP) assaulted the mountain, the attempt of which was to be the first in history.

It was during this expedition that one of the peaks, now known as Mayo's Peak was named after one of the team members, Mayo Monteza, who celebrated his birthday during the climb. One of the water spring sources is now known as Bulod's Spring, after a local guides named Bulod who volunteered (along with another locals) to join the climb.

The team failed to take the summit on this first attempt, but came back two weeks afterwards. On 17 June 1982, four climbers became the first to stand at the summit. Their names are Mon Ruiz, Kim Valino, Roel Tan Torres (of UP mountaineers) and Edwin Gatia of the PMS team.

In 2026, the Department of Environment and Natural Resources imposed an annual closure of the mountain for maintenance and rehabilitation from November to January.

== Biodiversity ==
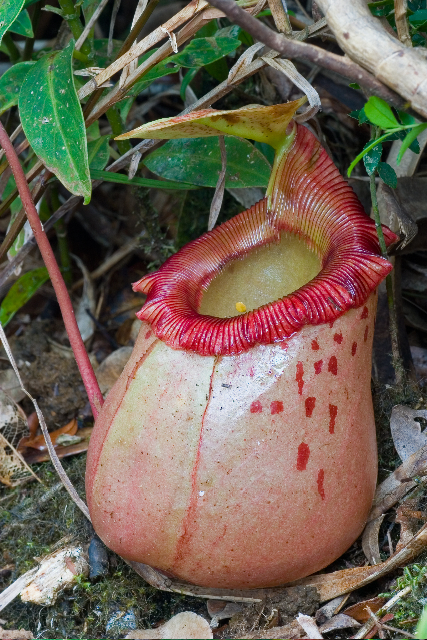
The pitcher plant Nepenthes sibuyanensis found only on the slopes of Mount Guiting-Guiting. Several nepenthes species are also found here.

Sibuyan Island has extremely high endemism largely due to its remoteness. More than half of the Island is covered with forest. Preliminary reports include that the forest density in Sibuyan is 1,551 trees per hectare making it the densest forest ever recorded in the Philippines. There exists a full range of forest gradient in the Philippines consisting of mangrove, lowland, montane, mossy forests, heathland, and grassland—from the shoreline up to the summit of Mt. Guiting-Guiting,

There are approximately 700 vascular plant species, including 54 species that are endemic to the island. These include Nepenthes sibuyanensis; Nepenthes argentii; Heterospathe sibuyanensis Becc. (Bil-is), Agalmyla sibuyanensis (Sibuyan lipstick plant); Myrmephytum beccarii Elmer (Sibuyan ant plant); Begonia gitingensis Elmer (Guiting-guiting begonia).

A total of 130 species of birds have been recorded in the park, of which 102 are either known or presumed to be breeding residents. There are also nine (9) native non-flying terrestrial mammal species, nine fruit bats species, of which one is endemic, and nine (9) lizards and geckos.

== Gallery ==
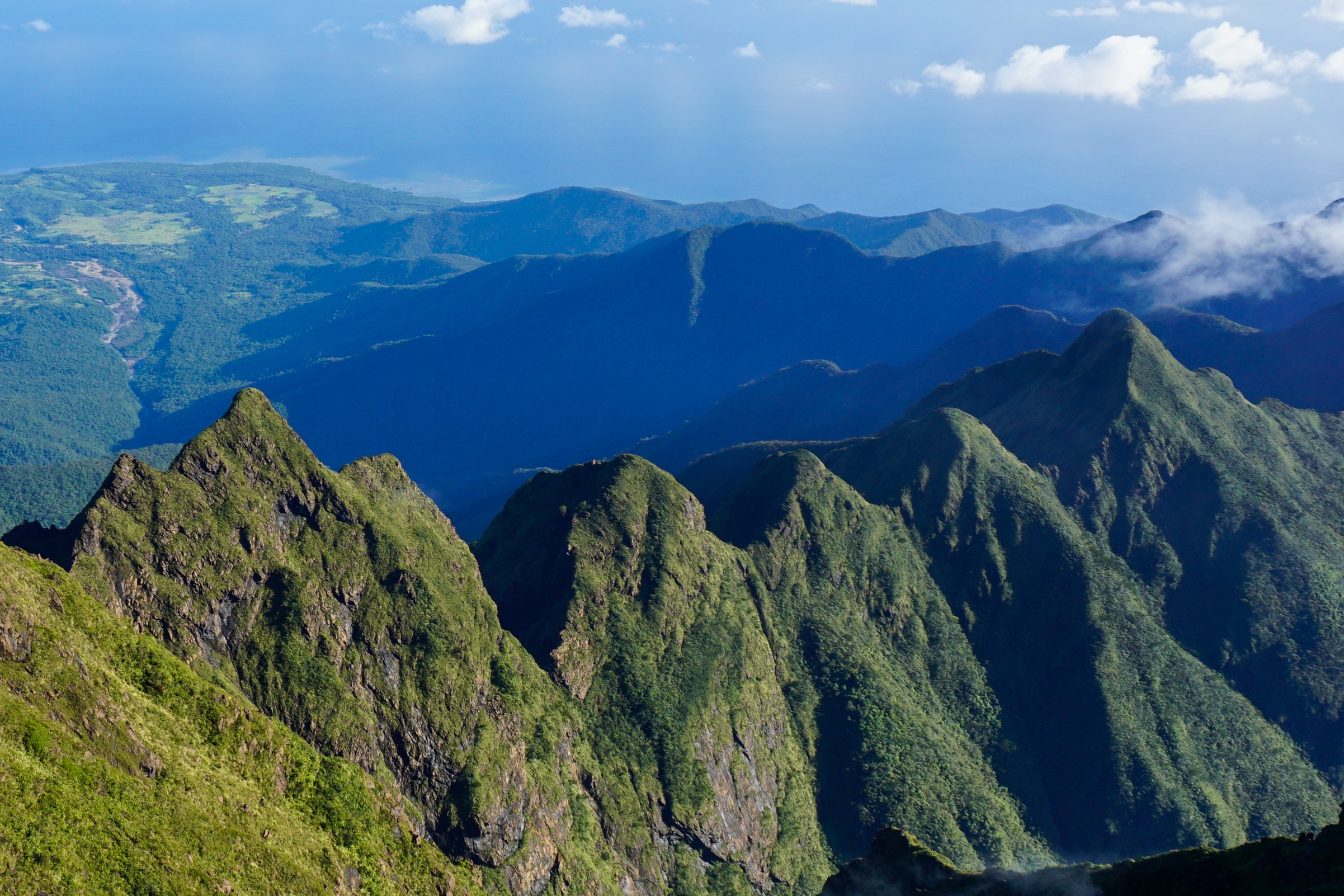
The jagged Peaks that give Mount Guiting-guiting its name.

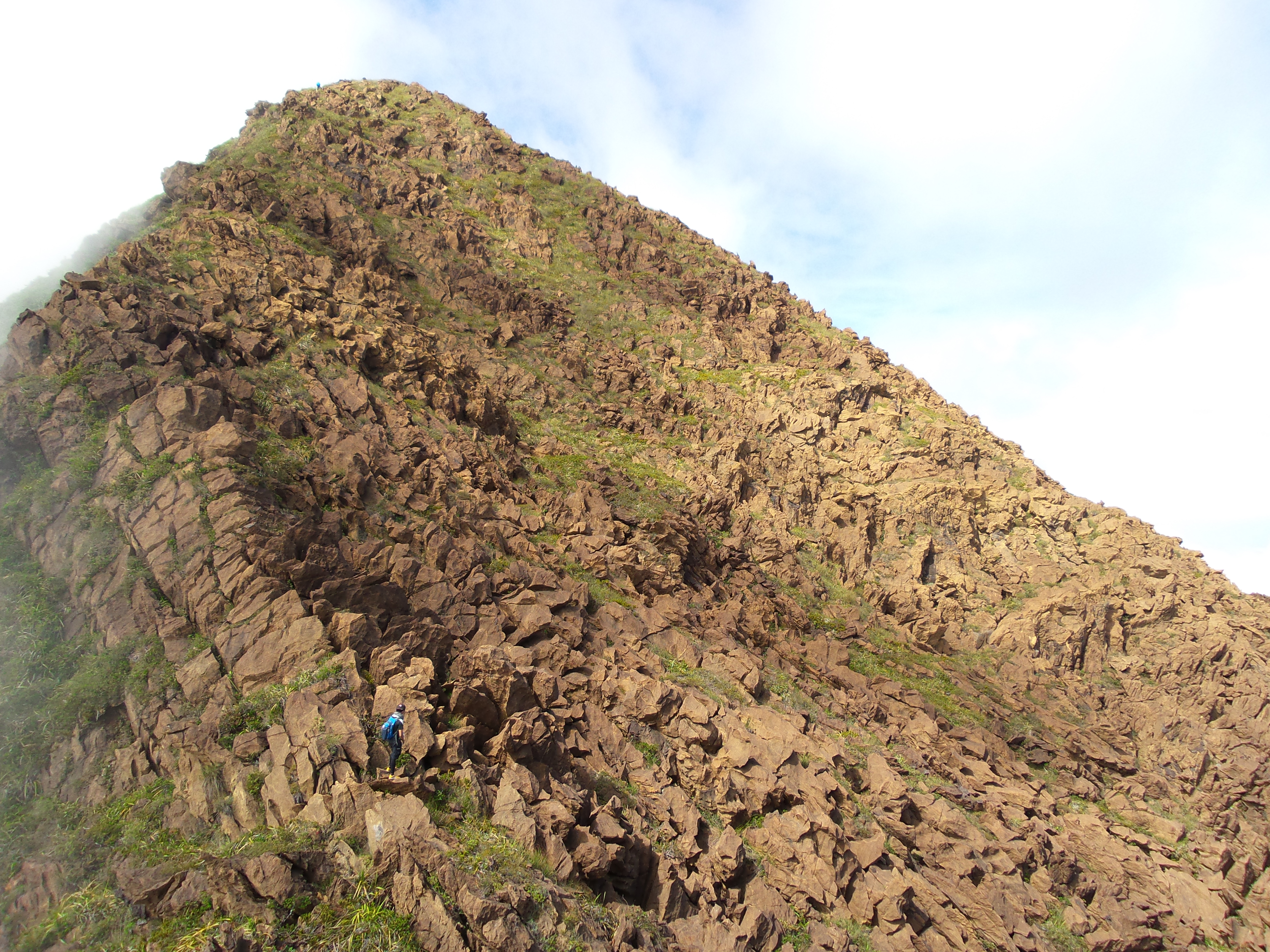
España Peak to the south of the summit. The southern sections are littered extensively with large boulders.

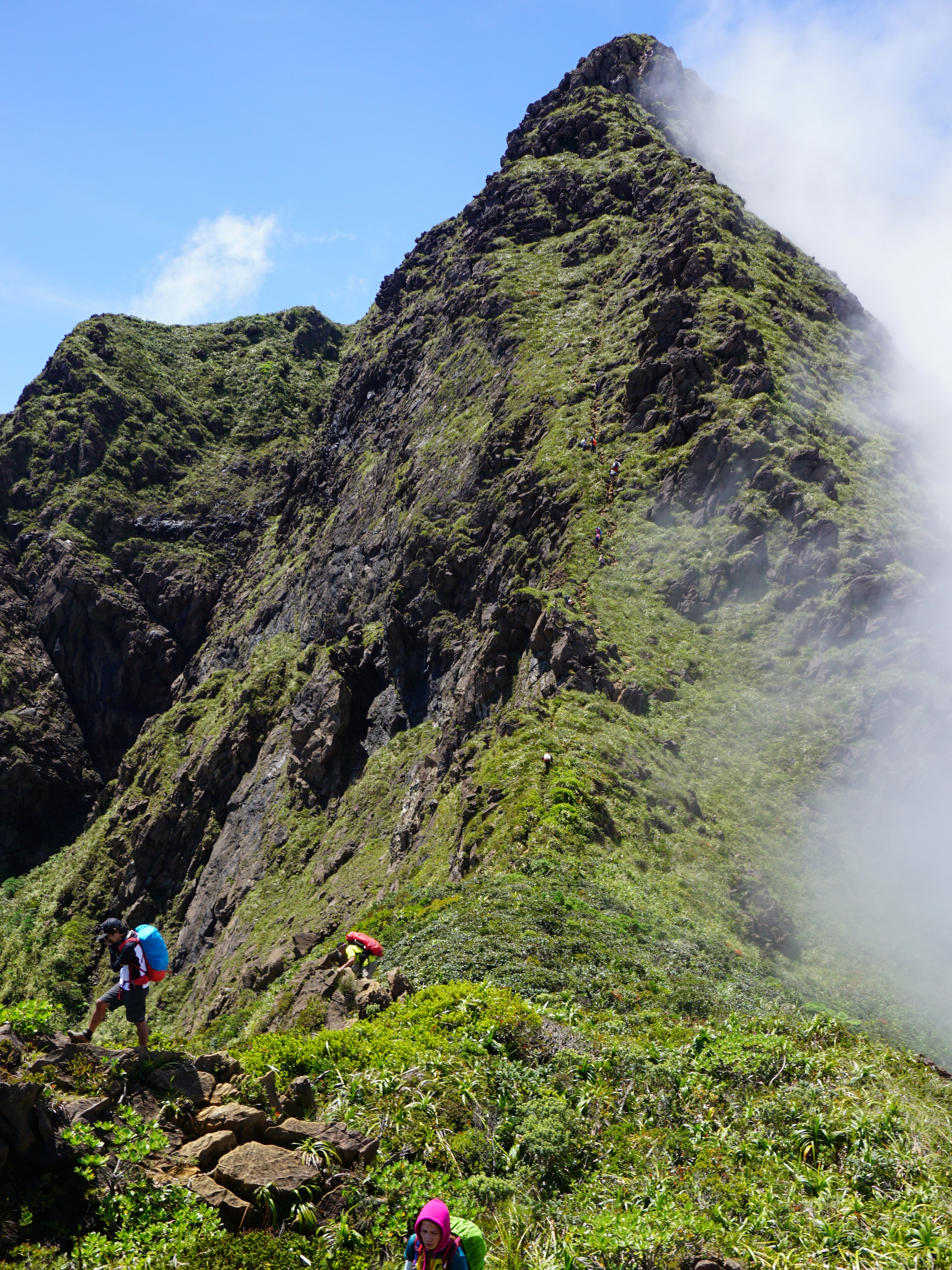
Hikers prepare to climb up the summit peak from the north side (Tampayan trail).

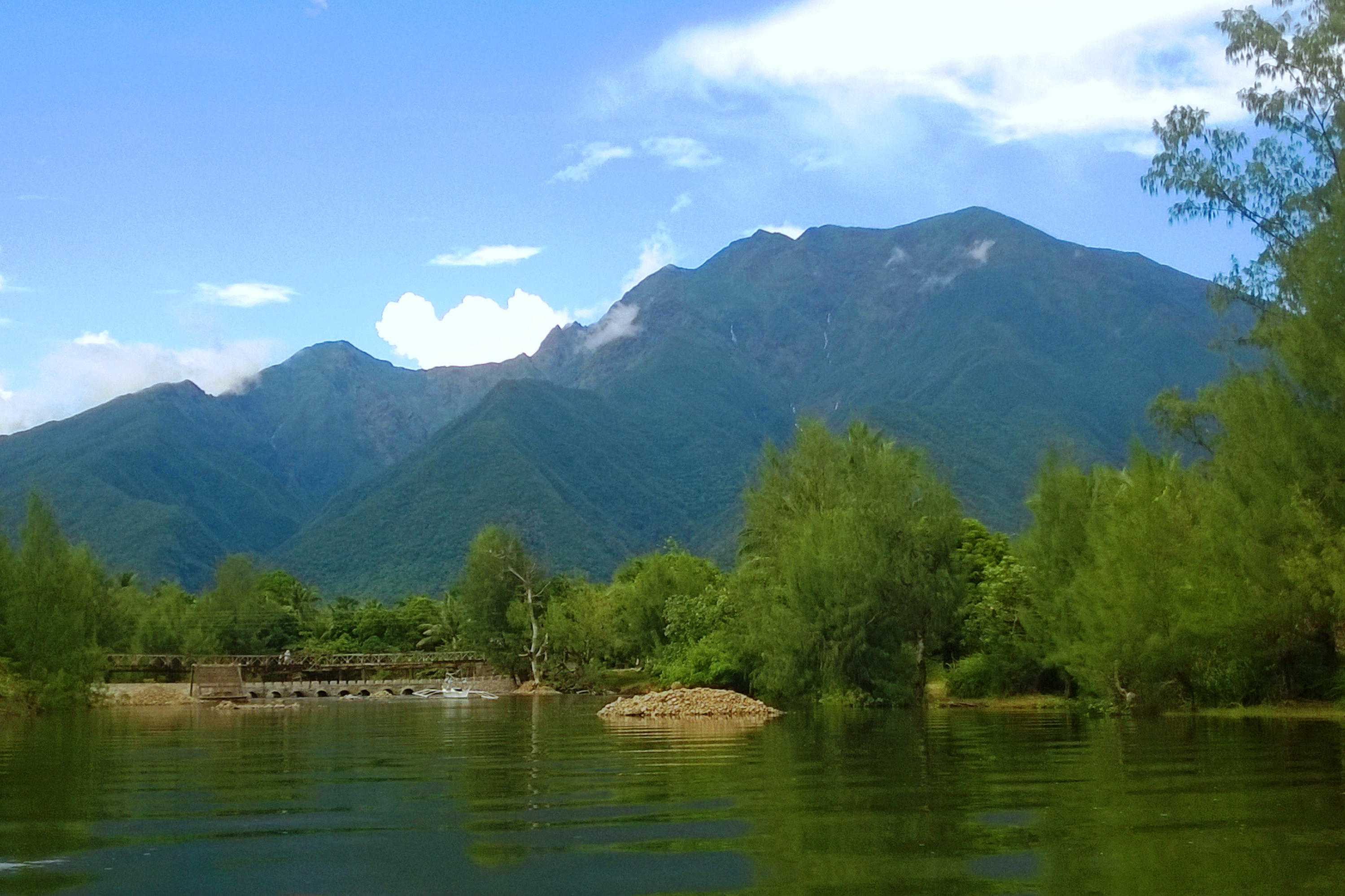
Mount Guiting-Guiting as viewed from the south.

== See also ==
- List of ultras of the Philippines
- List of islands by highest point
- List of natural parks of the Philippines
