= Haribon Foundation =

Philippine nature conservation organization

Haribon Foundation for the Conservation of Natural Resources, Inc.
- Company type: Environmental
- Founded: 1972
- Founder: Edmundo Casiño
- Headquarters: Quezon City, Philippines
- Key people: Belinda dela Paz (OIC)
- Website: www.haribon.org.ph

The Haribon Foundation for the Conservation of Natural Resources, Inc., simply known as Haribon Foundation, is a nature conservation organization in the Philippines. The name "Haribon" ("bird king") is a reference to the Philippine eagle. The group was founded in 1972 as a bird-watching society.

== Philippine luminous seahorse sanctuary ==
A marine sanctuary for luminous seahorses was set up by the Haribon Foundation in 1995. The site received official protection in 1998, and in 2007 it was judged the country's most outstanding marine protected area by the MPA Support Network.
