= Sibuyanon =

Indigenous people of Sibuyan, the Philippines

May-as, also called Mangyan tagabukid, is a term for the indigenous people of the island of Sibuyan, in the Philippines.

Sibuyanon is the name of the dialect of Romblomanon spoken on the island of Sibuyan.

The local people commonly refer to them as “Mangyan”. the Indigenous people, however, prefer to call them “Sibuyanon”, the way the other inhabitants on the island are called. This is because they are aware that the term “Mangyan” carries with negative connotations among lowlanders. It is unsure if they are even related to the Mangyans of Mindoro Island to the northwest.

The May-as are clustered in groups of two to four houses, scattered throughout the rolling and hilly areas of Sibuyan Island. They are essentially farmers, but they also extract resources from the forests and rivers.
