= Mimaropa =

Administrative region of the Philippines

- Region
- Southwestern Tagalog Region
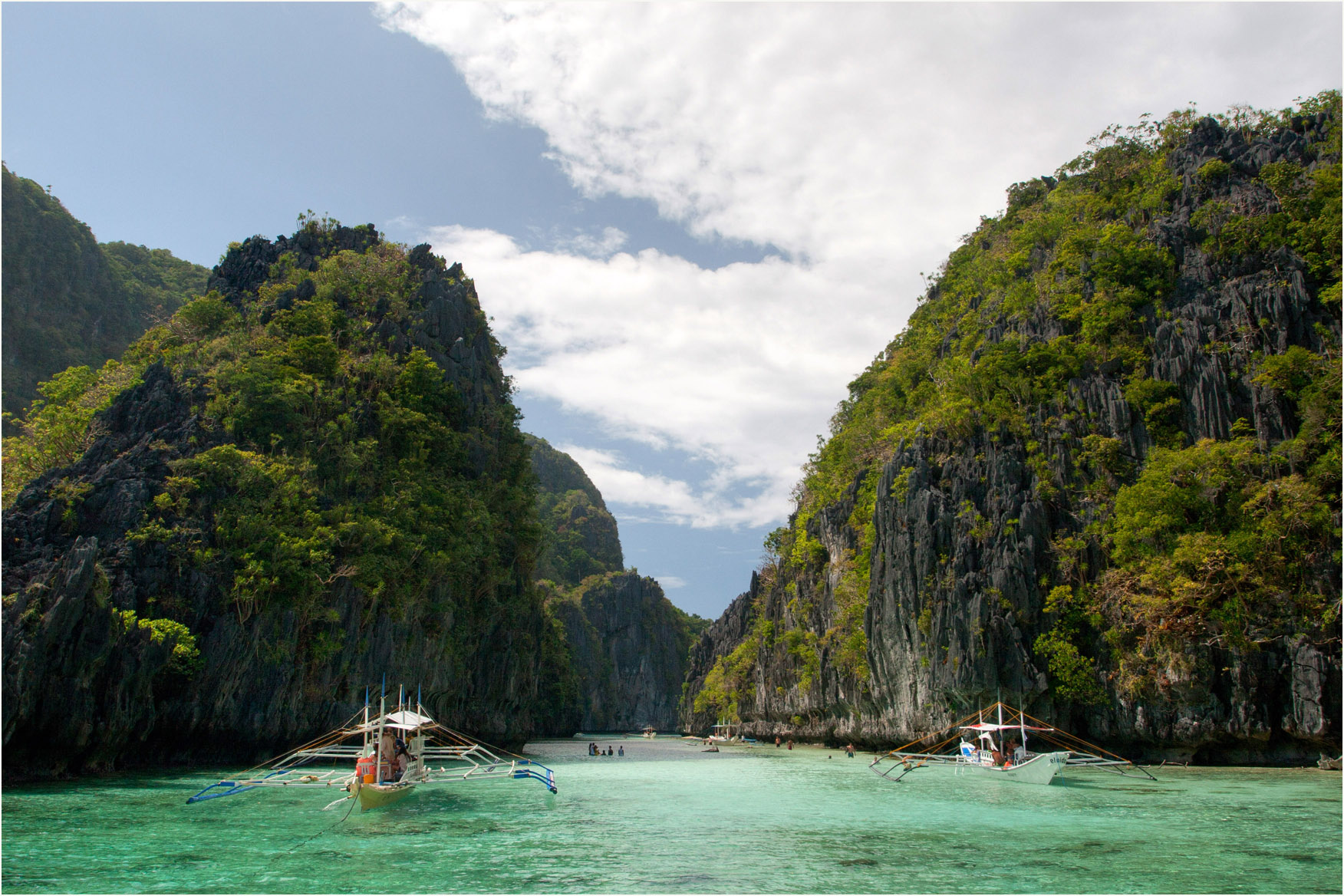
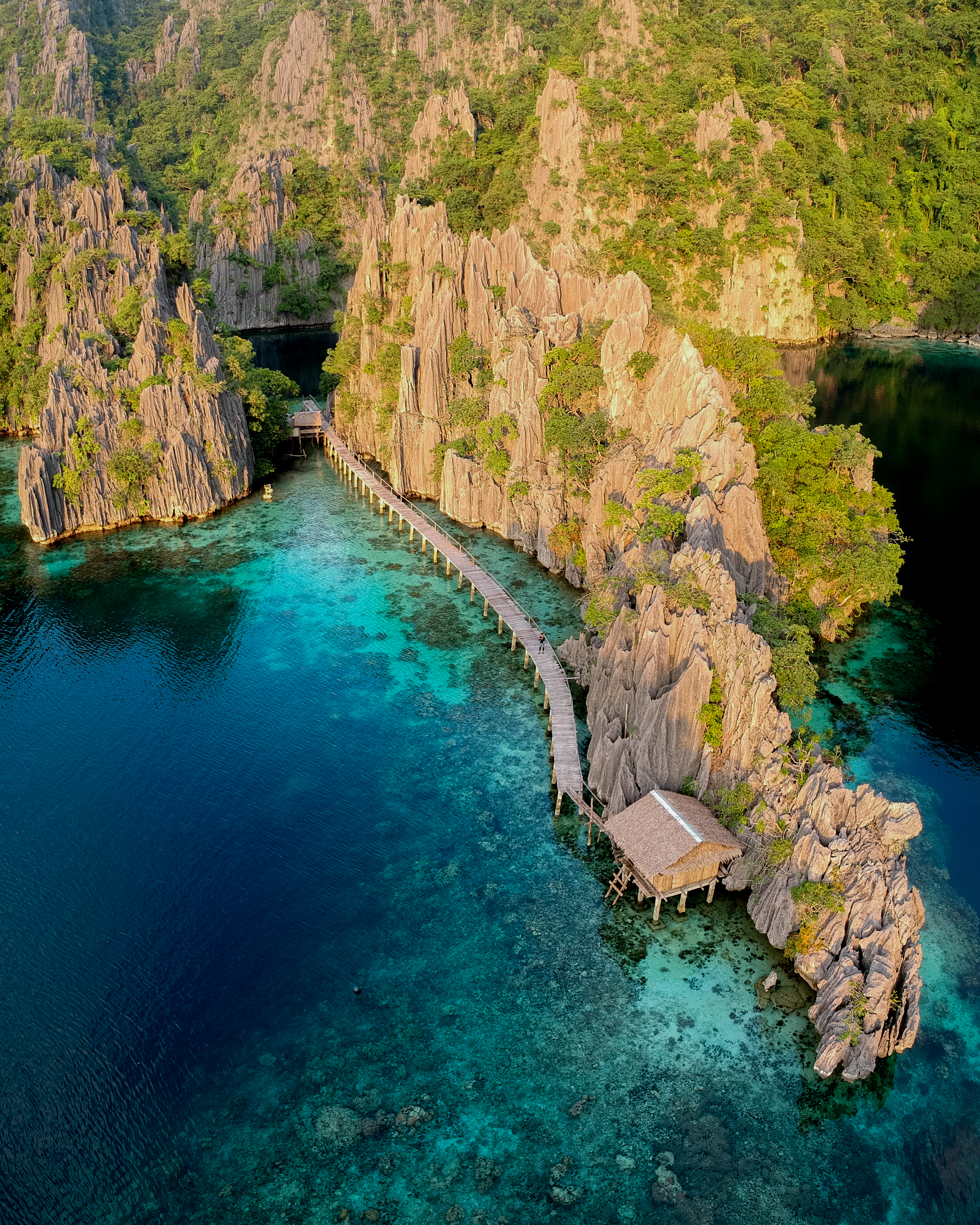
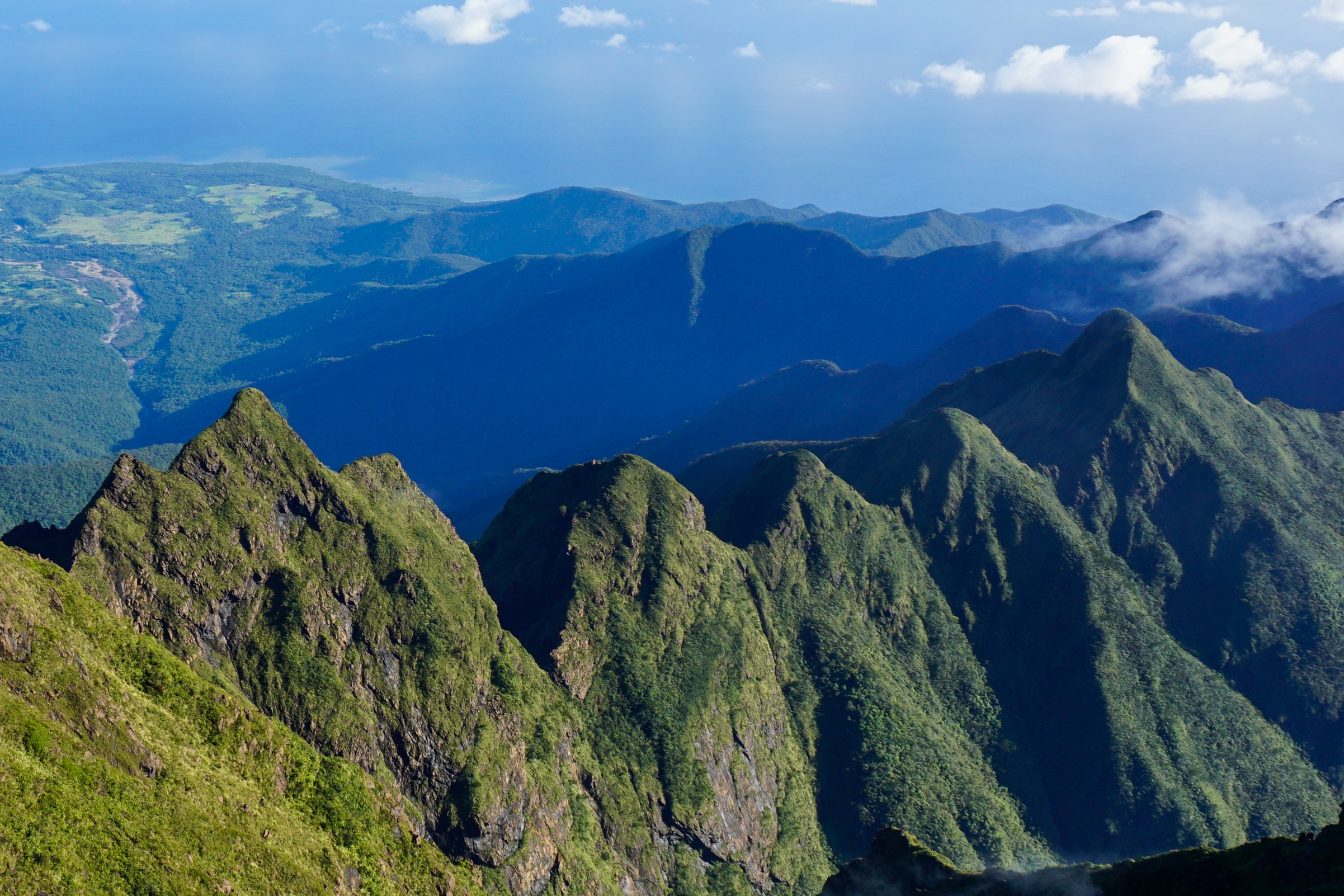
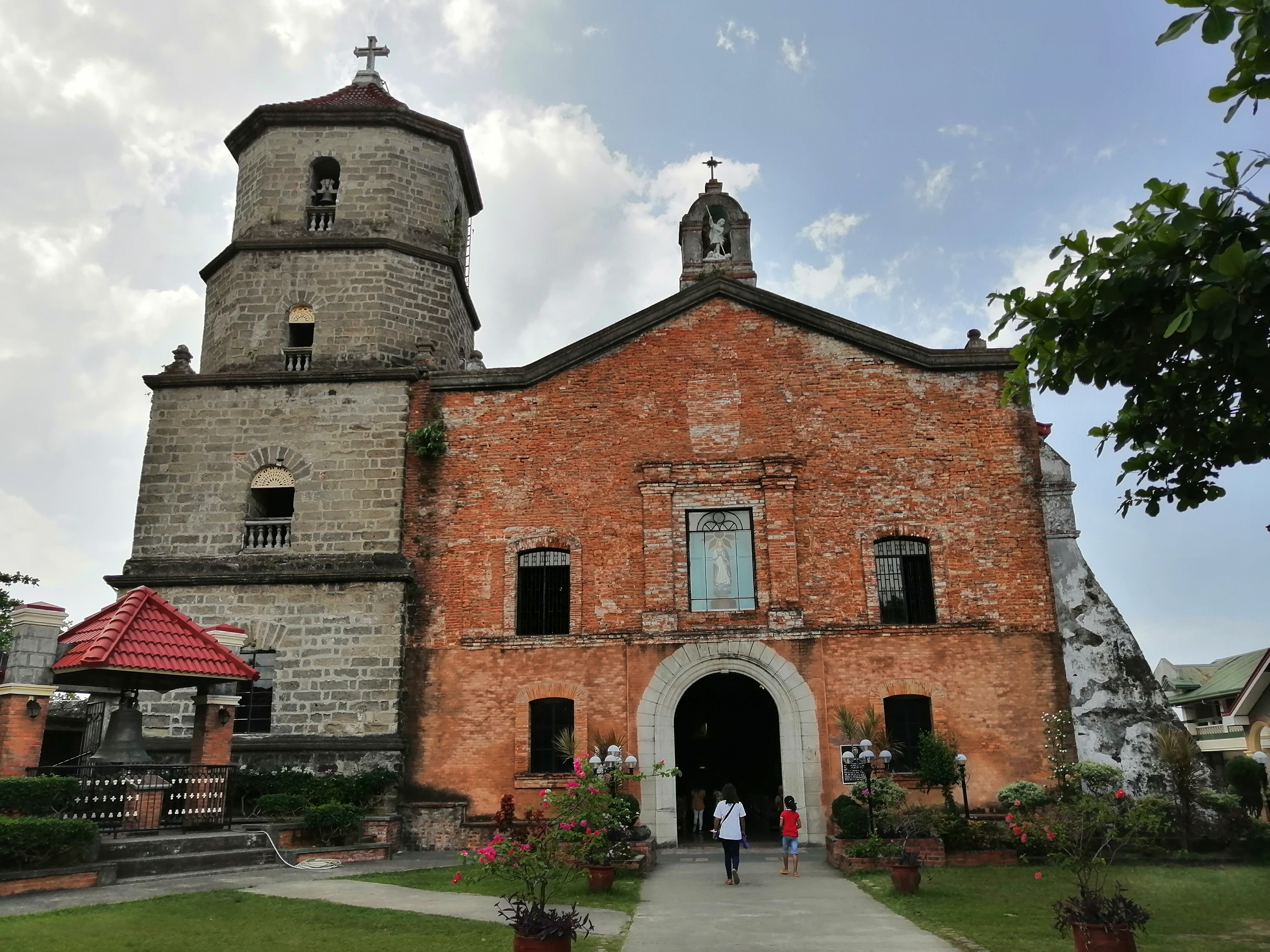
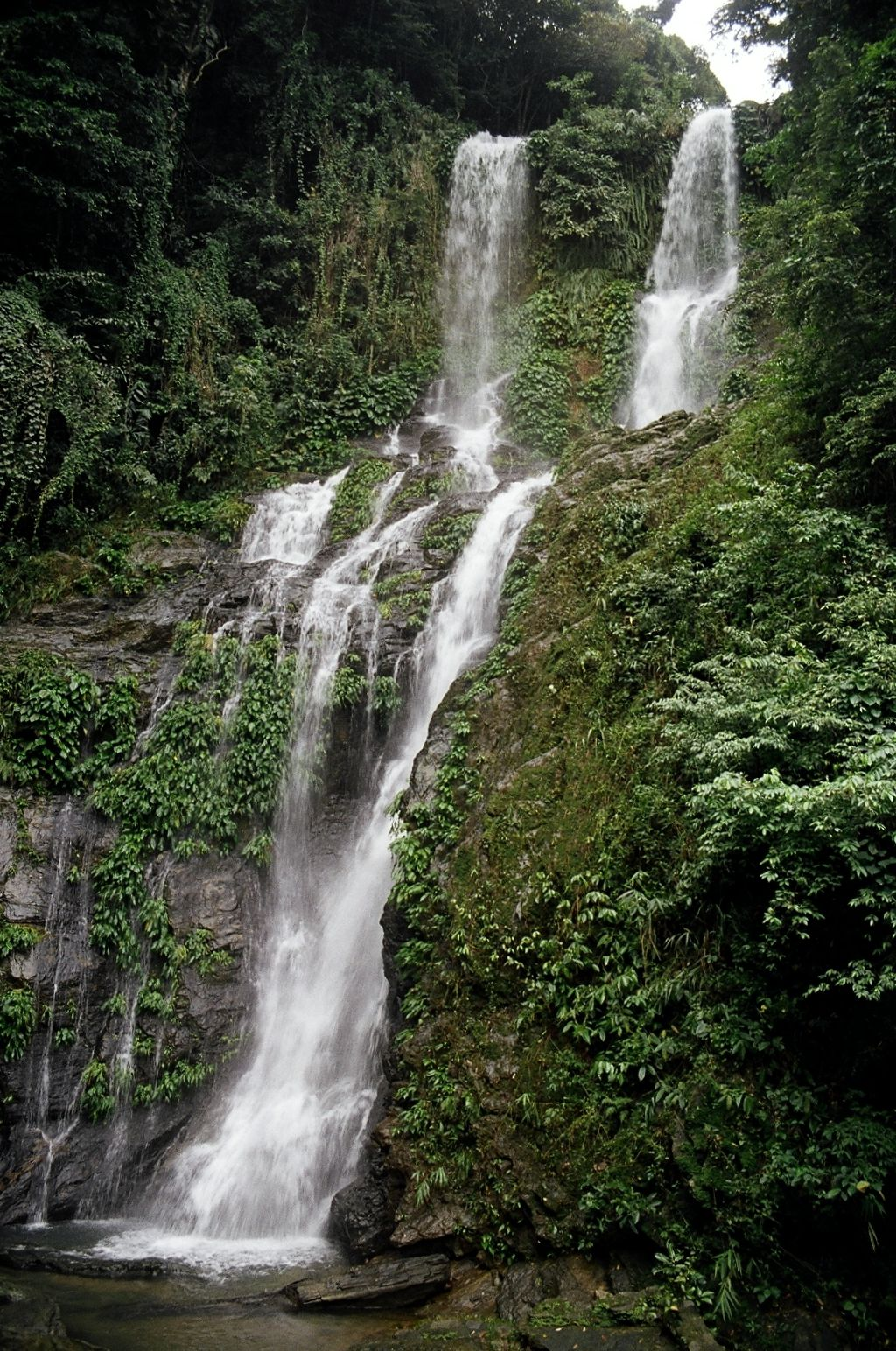
- Clockwise from the top: El Nido, Palawan, Mount Guiting-Guiting, Tamaraw Falls, Boac Cathedral, Coron Island
- Anthem: Mimaropa March
- Location in the Philippines
- Interactive map of Mimaropa
- Coordinates: 10°40′N 119°30′E
- Country: Philippines
- Island group: Luzon
- Regional center: Calapan
- Largest city: Puerto Princesa

Area
  - Total: 29,620.90 km^{2} (11,436.69 sq mi)
- Highest elevation (Mount Halcon): 2,586 m (8,484 ft)

Population (2024 census)
  - Total: 3,245,446
  - Density: 109.5661/km^{2} (283.7749/sq mi)
  - Households: 792,875

Divisions
  - Provinces: 5: Marinduque; Occidental Mindoro; Oriental Mindoro; Palawan; Romblon
  - Independent cities: 1: Puerto Princesa
  - Component cities: 1: Calapan
  - Municipalities: 71
  - Barangays: 1,460
  - Districts: 7

Economy
  - Poverty incidence: 11.3% (2025)
  - GDP total: US$8.9 billion (2024)
  - GDP per capita: US$2,680
  - HDI (2023): 0.703 high · 13th of 17
- Time zone: UTC+8 (PST)
- PSGC: 1700000000
- ISO 3166 code: PH-14
- Electorate: 2,055,827 voters (2025)
- Languages: Tagalog; Romblomanon; Bantoanon or Asi; Onhan; Cuyonon; Hiligaynon; English; others

Mimaropa (officially stylized in all caps), officially the Southwestern Tagalog Region (Filipino: Rehiyong Timog-Kanlurang Tagalog) and also known as Region IV-B, is an administrative region in the Philippines. The name is an acronym combination of its constituent provinces: Mindoro (divided into Occidental Mindoro and Oriental Mindoro), Marinduque, Romblon, and Palawan. It is the only region in the country outside the Visayas that has no land border with another region.

The region was part of the now-defunct Southern Tagalog region until May 17, 2002. On May 23, 2005, Palawan and the highly urbanized city of Puerto Princesa were moved to the region of Western Visayas by Executive Order No. 429. However, on August 19, 2005, President Arroyo issued Administrative Order No. 129 to put in abeyance Executive Order No. 429 pending a review. On July 17, 2016, Republic Act No. 10879 officially designated the Southwestern Tagalog Region as Mimaropa, replacing the Region IV-B designation; however, no boundary changes were made. Nonetheless, the name continues to be used by other government agencies and the media.

Calapan is Mimaropa's regional center, while the highly urbanized city of Puerto Princesa is the most populous in the region. However, most regional government offices, such as the Department of Public Works and Highways and the Department of Budget and Management, are in Quezon City, Metro Manila, because Quezon City was the regional capital of Southern Tagalog.

== History ==
Mimaropa, together with Calabarzon and Aurora was officially created with the partitioning of Southern Tagalog (Region IV) into the two regions on May 17, 2002, with the issuance of Executive Order No. 103 by then-President Gloria Macapagal Arroyo, for the purpose of promoting efficiency in the government, accelerating social and economic development, and improving public services in the provinces covered. Region IV-B was designated as Mimaropa, which stands for the island provinces belonging to the Southern Tagalog region—Mindoro (Oriental and Occidental), Marinduque, Romblon and Palawan. Region IV-A was designated as Calabarzon. Marinduque was a sub-province of Quezon, at that time known as Tayabas; it became an independent province in 1920. Quezon is now part of Calabarzon. Romblon was a subprovince of Capiz and was part of Western Visayas. When President Ferdinand Marcos enacted Presidential Decree No. 1, which organized the provinces into 11 regions as part of Marcos' Integrated Reorganization Plan, Romblon was transferred from Western Visayas to Southern Tagalog. Before World War II, Palawan was administratively grouped with Western Visayas.

On May 23, 2005, Executive Order 429 was issued, moving the province of Palawan to the region of Western Visayas, designating Region IV-B as "Mimaro". However, Palawan residents criticized the move, citing a lack of consultation, with most in Puerto Princesa and nearly all municipalities preferring to remain in Region IV-B. Consequently, Administrative Order No. 129 was issued on August 19, 2005, to address this backlash. This order directed the abeyance of Executive Order 429 pending the approval of an implementation plan for the orderly transfer of Palawan from Mimaropa to Region VI.

The 2010 Philippine Census of Population reported the region's name as "Mimaropa" and included Palawan as part of the region. As of 2014, it is unclear whether the transfer of Palawan to Western Visayas is still pending within the Philippine government. As of 2014, the National Statistical Coordinating Board of the Philippines continued to list Palawan province as part of the Mimaropa region.

On July 17, 2016, Republic Act No. 10879 formally established the Southwestern Tagalog Region to be known as the Mimaropa Region. This involved no boundary changes but was in effect merely a renaming and discontinuation of the "Region IV-B" designation.

== Demographics ==
Population census of Mimaropa
Year	Pop.	±% p.a.
1903	179,800	—
1918	262,462	+2.55%
1939	406,377	+2.10%
1948	468,619	+1.60%
1960	722,227	+3.67%
1970	1,020,222	+3.51%
1975	1,219,609	+3.64%
1980	1,408,040	+2.91%
1990	1,774,074	+2.34%
1995	2,033,271	+2.59%
2000	2,299,229	+2.67%
2007	2,559,791	+1.49%
2010	2,744,671	+2.57%
2015	2,963,360	+1.47%
2020	3,228,558	+1.82%
2024	3,245,446	+0.13%
Source: Philippine Statistics Authority

=== Languages ===
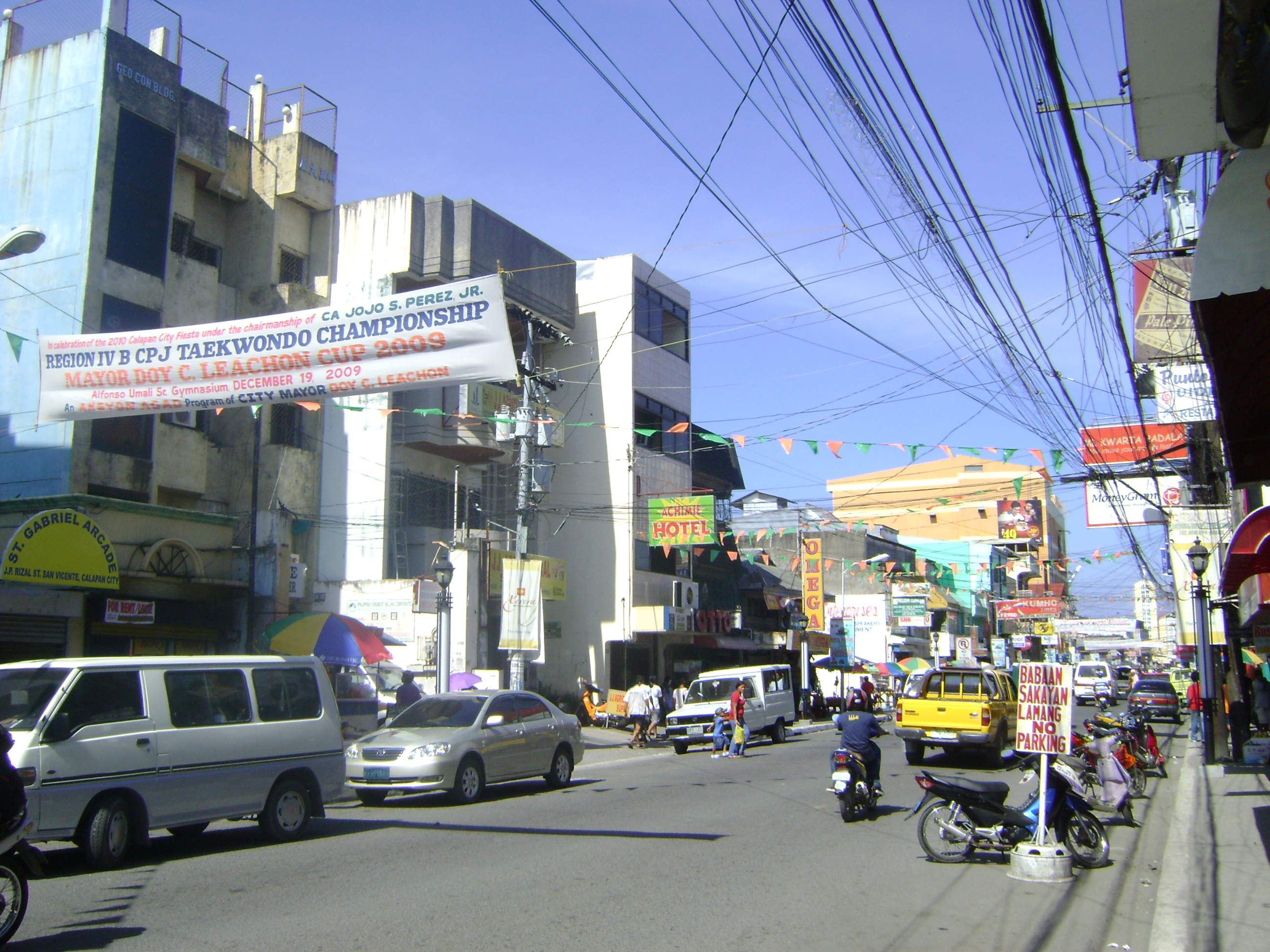
A view of Calapan as seen in December 2009

The native languages of Mimaropa are:

- Alangan, spoken in the interior of Mindoro.
- Asi, spoken in Romblon and Marinduque.
- Bonggi, spoken in the southernmost islands of Palawan
- Buhid, spoken in the interior of Mindoro.
- Calamian Tagbanwa, spoken in Palawan.
- Cuyonon, spoken in Palawan.
- Hanunoo, spoken in the interior of Mindoro.
- Hiligaynon, spoken in Palawan and Romblon.
- Iraya, spoken in the interior of Mindoro.
- Jama Mapun, spoken in the southernmost islands of Palawan
- Karay-a or Kinaray-a, spoken in eastern parts of Palawan, southern parts Mindoro and southern parts of Romblon.
- Molbog, spoken in south Palawan.
- Onhan, spoken in Romblon.
- Palawano, spoken in Palawan.
- Ratagnon, spoken in the south Mindoro.
- Romblomanon, spoken in Romblon.
- Sabah Malay, spoken in south Palawan.
- Sibuyanon, spoken in Romblon.
- Tadyawan, spoken in the interior of Mindoro.
- Tagalog, spoken in Occidental Mindoro, Oriental Mindoro, Marinduque, Romblon, and Palawan. It is the regional lingua franca, mostly as Filipino.
- Tausug, spoken in southwestern Palawan.
- Tawbuid, spoken in the interior of Mindoro.

== Economy ==
Poverty Incidence of Mimaropa

Source: Philippine Statistics Authority

In 2007, Mimaropa's economy surged by 9.4%, making it the fastest growing region in the country in that year. It was aided by robust growth in the industrial sector which grew by 19.1% from -6.1% in 2006. Mimaropa experienced a big slowdown in 2006, posting a decelerated growth of 2.3% from a 6.4% increase in 2005. This resulted mainly from the slump in the industry sector, which shrunk by 5.4% in 2006 from its 10.8% increase in 2005.

The agriculture, forestry, and fishing sector, which contributed 42.1% to the total regional economy, grew by 9.1% in 2006, accelerating from 3.2% the previous year. The higher production of rice, maize, other crops, livestock and fishery resulted in the accelerated growth in the total agriculture and fishery sector.

The industry sector, which contributed 38.3% to the region's total economy, was the second largest contributor next to agriculture. Its decline of 5.4% was largely attributed to the decrease in the mining and quarrying sub-sector, which went down by 15.4% due to the reduced production of natural gas in Palawan. Mining and quarrying contributed 16.6% to the total regional economy. The positive growth in the electricity and water, construction and manufacturing sub-sectors were not able to compensate for the drop in the mining and quarrying sub-sector.

The service sector, on the other hand, posted an accelerated growth of 5.1%, which was attributed to the increase in the TCS, finance, private services, government services and trade sub-sectors, which managed to post accelerated growths of 6.0%, 5.5%, 5.1%, 5.1% and 4.7%, respectively. The other sub-sector, however, had a decelerated growth due to the slowdown in the ownership of dwellings.

== Tourism ==
There are many scenic spots in Mimaropa. Some of them are the Bathala Cave, Balanacan Bay, and Tres Reyes Islands in the province of Marinduque; White Island in Mindoro; Fort San Andres, Mount Guiting-Guiting, and Bonbon Beach in Romblon; and the Puerto Princesa Subterranean River National Park and El Nido Marine Reserve Park in Palawan.

== Administrative divisions ==
=== Provinces ===
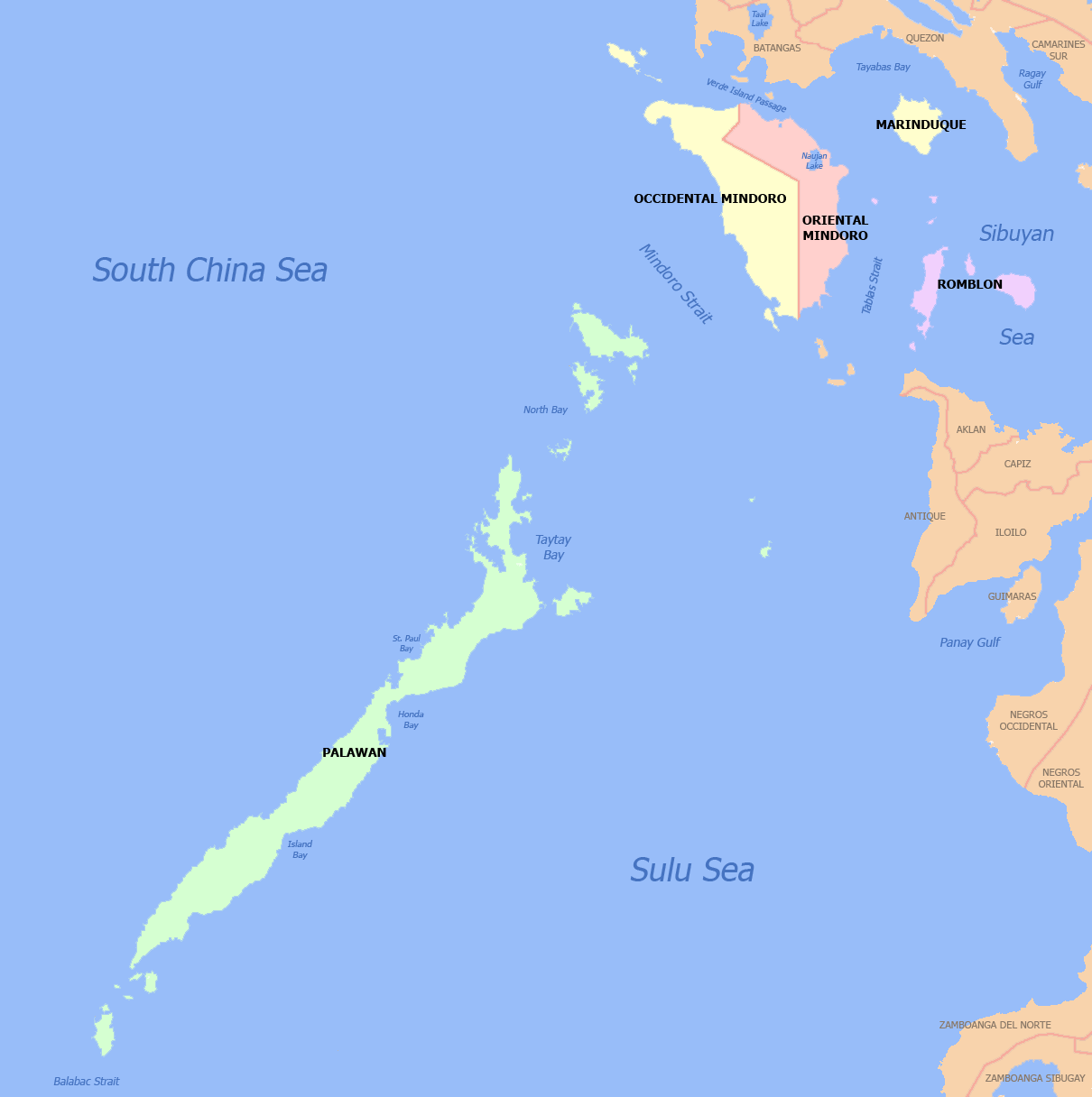
Political map of Mimaropa

Mimaropa comprises 5 provinces, 1 highly urbanized city (Puerto Princesa), 1 component city (Calapan), 71 municipalities and 1,460 barangays.

- † Regional center

Province or HUC		Capital	Population (2020)		Area		Density		Cities	Muni.	Barangay
					km^{2}	sq mi	/km^{2}	/sq mi			
Marinduque		Boac	7.4%	239,207	952.58	367.79	250	650	0	6	218
Occidental Mindoro		Mamburao	16.3%	525,354	5,865.70	2,264.76	90	230	0	11	164
Oriental Mindoro		† Calapan	28.1%	908,339	4,238.40	1,636.46	210	540	1	14	426
Palawan		Puerto Princesa	29.1%	939,594	14,649.70	5,656.28	64	170	0	23	367
Romblon		Romblon	9.6%	308,985	1,533.50	592.09	200	520	0	17	219
Puerto Princesa	†	—	9.5%	307,079	2,381.02	919.32	130	340	—	—	66
Total				3,228,558	29,620.90	11,436.69	110	280	2	71	1,460
† Puerto Princesa is a highly urbanized city pursuant to Presidential Proclamation No. 1264; figures are excluded from Palawan.

==== Governors and vice governors ====
Province	Image	Governor	Political Party	Vice Governor
Marinduque		Melecio J. Go	PDP–Laban	Romulo A. Bacorro Jr.
Occidental Mindoro		Eduardo Gadiano	PFP	Anecita Diana Apigo-Tayag
Oriental Mindoro		Humerlito Dolor	GSM	Antonio S. Perez Jr.
Palawan		Amy R. Alvarez	PPPL	Leoncio Nacasi Ola
Romblon	Gov. Trina Firmalo Fabic	Trina Alejandra Q. Firmalo-Fabic	Liberal	Armando Gutierrez
