= Alyansa Tigil Mina =

- Company type: non-governmental organization
- Founded: 2004
- Headquarters: Quezon City, Philippines
- Website: www.alyansatigilmina.net

Alyansa Tigil Mina (abbreviated as ATM, transl. "Alliance to End Mining") is an environmental advocacy organization that campaigns to protect communities and the environment from the ill effects of large-scale mining operations in the Philippines. It is a coalition composed of non-governmental organizations, church groups, and academic institutions and is the largest anti-mining advocacy network in the country. Alyansa Tigil Mina began as a loose collective that began meeting in 2004 to address threats posed to sustainable development initiatives by the revival of mining operations in the Philippines.

Alyansa Tigil Mina takes part in campaigns for environmental protection and Indigenous people's rights. The alliance calls for a nationwide moratorium on large-scale mining operations; the passage of an Alternative People's Mining Act as well as the scrapping of the Philippine Mining Act of 1995; and rejection of the National Policy Agenda on Revitalizing Mining in the Philippines and the National Minerals Action Plan.

Alyansa Tigil Mina participated in the Earth Strike international movement for climate action. It also joined environmentalist Gina Lopez and other groups in launching the "No to Mining in Palawan" signature campaign in 2011 following the murder of radio broadcaster and anti-mining activist Gerry Ortega.

In 2021, Alyansa Tigil Mina was among the 74 groups who signed a letter sent to Department of Environment and Natural Resources officials to oppose offshore magnetite mining in Cagayan province.

Amid the 2024 constitutional reform attempts in the Philippines, Alyansa Tigil Mina said that constitutional amendments would make the Philippines vulnerable to destructive exploitation by foreign corporations motivated by "profit over environmental protection and people’s welfare". The group said that the expansion of mining by foreign companies would destroy rivers, forests, mountains, and communities, worsen climate change impacts, destroy livelihoods, create health problems, and lead to human rights abuses.

During the flood control corruption scandal, Alyansa Tigil Mina and other environmental groups pushed for the passage of an anti-dynasty law, pointing out alleged links between political dynasties and mining companies. Alyansa Tigil Mina alleged former House Speaker Martin Romualdez, was linked to Marcventures Mining and Development Corporation, Benguet Corporation, and Brightgreen Resources Corporation, and said that mining companies will break environmental laws when these firms are owned by politicians. Alyansa Tigil Mina stated that mining has caused flooding in mining sites and noted the connection between mining, floods, corruption, and budget scandals.

== See also ==
- Sibuyanons Against Mining
