= List of nature conservation organizations =

This is a list of nature conservation organisations that primarily aim to protect species, their habitats, and ecosystems.

== List of international conservation organisations ==
- African Wildlife Foundation - ensuring that wildlife and wild lands thrive in modern Africa
- Bat Conservation International - working to conserve the world's bats and their habitats
- BirdLife International - a global partnership of organisations that strive to conserve birds
- Center for Biological Diversity - protecting endangered species through legal action, petitions, media and activism
- Conservation International - secure the critical benefits that nature provides to humanity
- Durrell Wildlife Conservation Trust - mission to save species from extinction
- EcoHealth Alliance - protecting the health of people, animals, and the environment from emerging infectious diseases
- Fauna and Flora International - safeguard the future of southern Africa's large mammal populations
- Greenpeace - raising environmental issues to public knowledge
- International Anti-Poaching Foundation - created a structured military-like approach to conservation in Africa
- International Union for Conservation of Nature - a partnership of 1400 organisations working in the field of nature conservation
- MarAlliance - non-profit that supports the effective management and conservation of large marine wildlife and their critical habitats with the support of dependent communities.
- National Audubon Society - non-profit environmental organisation dedicated to conservation
- Ocean Conservancy - formulate ocean policy based on saving ocean.
- Population Balance - uses humane education to advocate for ecocentrism.
- Rainforest Action Network - preserves forests, protects the climate and upholds human rights
- Rainforest Alliance - provision of an environmental certification on forestry and agriculture
- Rainforest Foundation Fund - preserving rainforest by defending the rights of the indigenous peoples
- Rainforest Foundation UK - preserving rainforest by defending the rights of the indigenous peoples
- Rainforest Partnership - links communities in Latin American rainforests to partner communities in the United States
- Rainforest Trust - focused on the purchase of tropical lands
- Rare - helps communities adopt sustainable behaviors toward their environment
- The Nature Conservancy - largest environmental nonprofit by assets and revenue in the world.
- Wildlife Conservation Network - protecting endangered species and preserving their natural habitats.
- Wildlife Conservation Society - saves wildlife and wild places worldwide with programs in 60 countries; also manages five New York City wildlife parks including the Bronx Zoo
- World Wide Fund for Nature, also known as World Wildlife Fund - international conservation
- Zoological Society of London - devoted to the worldwide conservation of animals and their habitats

== List of national or local conservation organisations ==
=== Africa (and offshore islands) ===
- Tanzania Environmental Conservation Society (TECOSO Tanzania) - advancing environmental preservation, social and economic development sustainability in Tanzania

=== Americas ===
- Ancient Forest Alliance - conserving old growth forests in British Columbia, Canada
- American Prairie Foundation - building large wildlife reserve in Montana, United States
- Appalachian Trail Conservancy - Appalachian National Scenic Trail from Maine to Georgia
- California Coastal Conservancy - government agency that manages coastline resources
- Cape Ann Vernal Pond Team - nonprofit devoted to vernal pond conservation and education in Massachusetts
- Central Park Conservancy - manages 843 acre Central Park under a contract with City of New York
- Comunidad Inti Wara Yassi - Bolivian non-governmental organisation
- Conservancy of Southwest Florida
- Conserving Carolina
- Defenders of Wildlife - works to protect all native animals and plants throughout North America
- Ducks Unlimited
- Golden State Salmon Association - works to restore California's salmon
- Great Swamp Watershed Association
- Izaak Walton League of America - devoted to conservation in the United States
- The Land Conservancy of British Columbia (TLC) - land trust modeled after the National Trust of Britain
- Miami Conservancy District - Ohio agency that manages flood control of the Great Miami River
- National Wildlife Federation - conservation education and advocacy for Northern American Wildlife
- Nature Conservancy of Canada - help protect Canada's most important lands, waters and wildlife
- Open Space Institute - conservation organisation and think tank in the Eastern United States
- Pheasants Forever - conserving wildlife habitat suitable for pheasants.
- Point Blue Conservation Science - advancing conservation through bird and ecosystem research
- Rails-to-Trails Conservancy (RTC) - converted 13,150 miles (21,160 km) of former rail lines to trails
- Santa Lucia Conservancy - land trust and conservation community protecting 18,000 acres in California
- Santa Monica Mountains Conservancy - dedicated to the acquisition of land for conservation in California
- Sierra Nevada Conservancy - state conservancy in California
- Sierra Club
- The Conservation Fund - to pursue environmental preservation and economic development in the United States
- Theodore Roosevelt Conservation Partnership
- Urban Bird Foundation - to protect, defend, rescue and conserve bird life
- Western Pennsylvania Conservancy - 200,000 acres (800 km^{2})
- Whaleman Foundation - protection of cetaceans
- Wild Salmon Center - identifies and protects the best salmon ecosystems of the Pacific Rim (extends to Japan)
- Wolf River Conservancy - protects the Wolf River in Tennessee

=== Asia ===
- Conservancy Association - Hong Kong's oldest non-governmental environmental organisation
- Indian Council of Forestry Research and Education
- North China Institute of Water Conservancy and Hydroelectric Power - Chinese public university
- Wildlife Research and Conservation Trust - undertakes field research to promote the conservation of wildlife in India

=== Australia/Oceania ===
- Blue Mountains Conservation Society - NGO, conservation of Greater Blue Mountains area in Australia
- BirdLife Australia - Australian ornithological conservation organisation
- Department of Conservation (New Zealand)
- Live Ocean - New Zealand Marine conservation charity

=== Europe ===
- European Wildlife - conserve biological diversity with non-state reserves
- Federal Agency for Nature Conservation - Germany
- National Trust of Britain
- Pro Natura - 650 nature reserves in Switzerland (250 square kilometers)
- Ukraine Nature Conservation Society

=== Cave conservancies ===
To see organisations that are specialized land trusts managing caves and karst features in the United States, refer to Cave conservancies.

== See also ==
- List of environmental organizations
- List of population concern organizations
