= Sanjog =

Sanjog (lit. 'coincidence') may refer to:

- Sanjog (name), an Indian male given name
- Sanjog (1943 film), a Bollywood film
- Sanjog (1961 film), a Bollywood film starring Pradeep Kumar and Anita Guha
- Sanjog (1972 film), a Bollywood film starring Amitabh Bachchan and Mala Sinha
- Sanjog (1985 film), a Bollywood film starring Jeetendra and Jaya Prada
- Sanjog (TV series). 2022 Indian television series starring Rajneesh Duggal and Shefali Sharma

== See also ==
- Samyuktha (disambiguation)
- Sanjog Se Bani Sangini, 2010 Indian television series starring Mohammad Iqbal Khan and Binny Sharma
- Sanyog Mohite (born 1983), Indian director and producer
