= Blue Mountains Conservation Society =

Non-governmental environmental organization

- Blue Mountains Conservation Society Inc.
- Official logo
- Abbreviation: BMCS
- Formation: 1961
- Founded at: Katoomba NSW
- Merger of: Upper Blue Mountains Conservation Society and Lower Blue Mountains Conservation Society (1996)
- Type: NGO
- Legal status: Charity
- Purpose: Protect, conserve, and advocate for the natural environment of the Greater Blue Mountains
- Location: 92 Fletcher Street, Wentworth Falls NSW, Australia
- Coordinates: 33.7202°S 150.3627°E
- Region served: Greater Blue Mountains World Heritage area and adjoining State Conservation Areas and State Forests
- Members: >900 (in 2021)
- Main organ: Management committee
- Website: https://www.bluemountains.org.au

The Blue Mountains Conservation Society is an incorporated non-governmental organisation working to protect, conserve, and advocate for the natural environment of the Greater Blue Mountains World Heritage area in New South Wales, Australia. Its work includes the listing and protection of threatened species, populations and ecological communities of the Greater Blue Mountains and campaigns regarding climate change.

The society operates from an office in the Conservation Hut at Wentworth Falls, which belongs to NSW National Parks and Wildlife Service. It is governed by a management committee and has a number of sub-committees, including for the topics of environmental education, land use, national parks and world heritage areas, and events.

== History ==
=== Split societies ===
In 1961, the Katoomba and District Fauna and Flora Protection Society was established with Frank Walford as patron and Fred Astle as president. The name was changed again in 1962 to Katoomba and District Wildlife Conservation Society. In July 1963, the society moved into a renovated tea room built in 1930, owned by Blue Mountains City Council and called Conservation Hut. The hut was demolished in 1990. In June 1970, the first edition of the newsletter, Newsletter No. 1, was published. In the same year, teacher and conservationist Allen Axel Strom became patron of the society. In 1983, the society changed its name to Upper Blue Mountains Conservation Society.

In 1966, the Lower Blue Mountains Wildlife Conservation Society was formed with H.L. (Lindsay) Paish as president. In 1967, publishing of the first edition of the newsletter, known as "Kalori", an Aboriginal word that was said to mean "message stick".

=== United society ===
In 1996, the Lower and Upper Blue Mountains Societies merged to become Blue Mountains Conservation Society Inc.

== Activities and campaigns ==
The society generally serves the Greater Blue Mountains area, but has also been involved in national campaigns such as Save The Franklin, Daintree and Myall Lakes, and has participated in Nature Conservation Council initiatives. Local activities of the individual societies and later the Blue Mountains Conservation Society have included education of the public, campaigning for the protection of natural areas, bush walking, bush care, propagation and study of native plants, and bush walking track restoration.

=== Campaigns ===
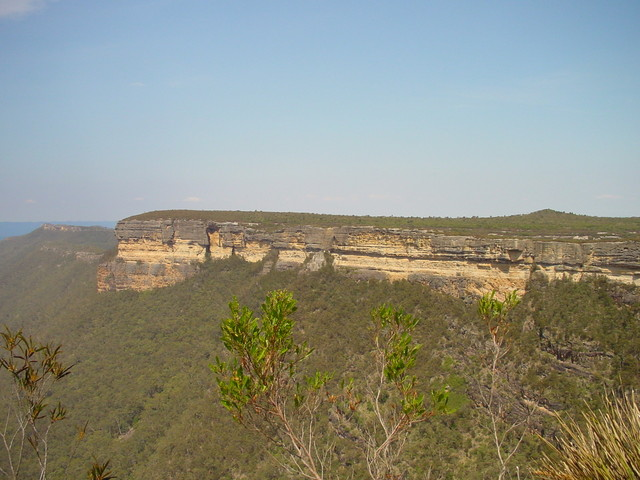
Kanangra Walls in Kanangra-Boyd National Park, 2002

- The 1960s and 1970s saw campaigns eventually preventing limestone mining in the Colong Caves and stopped exotic pine plantations and the construction of a paper pulp mill on Boyd Plateau. The campaign led to the abandonment of the mining proposal and the pine plantations on the Boyd Plateau, and both areas were added to the Kanangra-Boyd National Park.
- In 1988, after lobbying the Blue Mountains City Council, an Environmental Officer was appointed by council, being one of the few people in NSW to hold such a position at the time. The officer identified environmentally sensitive land in the Blue Mountains, which found consideration in council’s Local Environmental Plan 1991. His work also led to the gazetting of two forms of Blue Mountains hanging swamps.
- Submissions were made in relation to the draft Local Environment Plan 1991 and subsequent plans, advocating for amendments to damaging development proposals and addressing the rules that permitted such environmental damage in LEPs and state legislation, and resulting in the protection of specific local environmental details.
- A campaign for the legal protection of the Blue Mountains swamps was organised, which included the advocacy for an additional category of vulnerable ecological communities in the Threatened Species Conservation Act (achieved 2002), for listing under the federal EPBC Act (achieved 2005) and under NSW legislation (achieved 2007).
- UNESCO World Heritage for the Blue Mountains campaigns. The first submission lodged in 1989 was unsuccessful, but the subsequent campaign in 1992 eventually led to the inscription of the Greater Blue Mountains Area on the World Heritage List at the 24th Session of the World Heritage Committee, held in Cairns in 2000.
- In 2014, Western Sydney University published research which became the basis for a campaign urging the Environmental Protection Authority to take action against the pollution of the Wollongambe River. For over 40 years, the Centennial Coal Clarence Colliery underground coal mine at Lithgow discharged poorly treated wastewater directly into the river, which flows through the heart of the Blue Mountains. In 2015, a mine wall collapsed causing further pollution of the river, its impact being compared by the Wilderness Foundation to a giant oil spill. In 2019, the Environmental Protection Authority issued regulations requiring Clarence Colliery to reduce the release of pollutants, particularly zinc and nickel, which had water quality improve and animals return to the river. The campaign is continuing (2022) due to remaining river and sediment pollution.

Since the declaration of a climate emergency by Blue Mountains City Council in 2019, the society has been calling on the public to urge council to take up the Ready for Renewables Council Challenge, which would see council to cut gas from council-owned buildings and infrastructure, reject new gas connections in the local government area and request planning scheme amendments by the state. A campaign in opposition to the raising of the dam wall of Warragamba Dam, being conducted together with the Colong Foundation for Wilderness, is still ongoing as of 2022. Raising of the dam wall would fragment and degrade two World Heritage listed Wilderness areas and destroy Aboriginal cultural heritage sites of the Gundungurra people, beyond those already inundated by the original construction.

== See also ==
- Time line and history
- Time line
