= List of Tanzanian conservation organisations =

This is a list of conservation, natural resource and ecology-related organisations in Tanzania, including both Tanzanian based organisations and international organisations represented in Tanzania.

- African Conservation Foundation
- African Wildlife Foundation
- Conservation Resource Centre
- Tanzania National Parks Authority
- Protected Area Management Solutions (PAMS)
- Frankfurt Zoological Society (FZS)
- Mikoko Development Foundation (MDF)
- Tanzania Environmental Conservation Society (TECOSO Tanzania)

== See also ==
- List of conservation organisations
- List of environmental organizations
