= Carex klaphakei =

Scientific classification
- Kingdom: Plantae
- Clade: Tracheophytes
- Clade: Angiosperms
- Clade: Monocots
- Clade: Commelinids
- Order: Poales
- Family: Cyperaceae
- Genus: Carex
- Species: C. klaphakei

Binomial name
- Carex klaphakei K.L.Wilson

Species of grass-like plant

Carex klaphakei, Klaphake's sedge, is a species of flowering plant in the family Cyperaceae, native to the Central Tablelands of New South Wales, Australia. It is known from only three locations, all hanging swamps of the Blue Mountains.
