= Samyuktha (disambiguation) =

Samyuktha is a 1988 Indian Kannada-language thriller film.

Samyuktha may also refer to:

== People ==
- Samyukta or Sanyogita, purported wife of medieval Indian king Prithviraj Chauhan, daughter of king Jaichand of Kannauj
- Samyuktha (actress, born 1995), Indian actress
- Samyuktha Hegde (born 1998), Indian Kannada and Tamil film actress
- Samyuktha Varma (born 1979), Indian actress

== Other ==
- Rani Samyuktha, a 1962 Indian Tamil-language historical romance film about queen Samyukta and king Prithviraj Chauhan
- Urs Samyuktha Paksha, a political party in the Indian state of Karnataka

== See also ==
- Sanjog (disambiguation)
- Sanyukt, Indian soap opera television series
