= Sanyog Mohite =

Indian director and producer (born 1983)

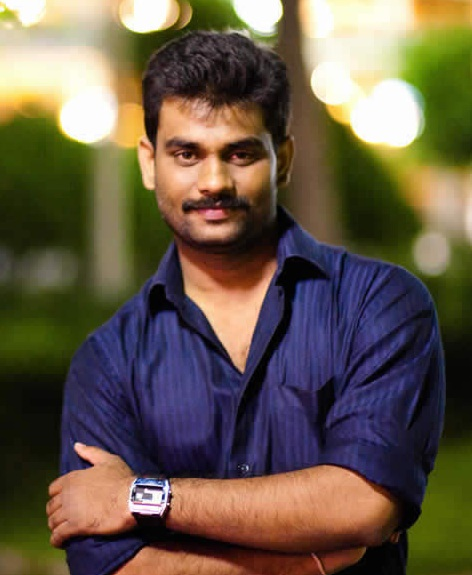
- Sanyog Mohite
- Born: 15 September 1983 (age 42); Sangli, Maharashtra, India
- Occupations: Director, Producer
- Years active: 2006–present
- Website: Official website

Sanyog Mohite (Marathi: संयोग मोहिते) (born 15 September 1983) is an Indian director and producer. He is also a known as an environmentalist due to his inclination towards making environmental films. His films have been nominated at various film festivals around the world and have also won various prestigious awards like Best Film at 'Ecofest 2010' and 'Vasundhara Mitra Puraskar 2014'. His prestigious achievement includes his film 'Armour' which was in association with Indian Army.

== Early life ==
Born to a Marathi family, Sanyog did his schooling and undergraduate studies in Satara. After obtaining a bachelor's degree in Mechanical Engineering he pursued a master's degree in Business Administration from University of Pune specializing in Marketing. He also made a documentary film for Network of Entrepreneurs in early 2008.

== Career ==
After the appreciation he received for Network of Entrepreneurs, Sanyog decided to take film making seriously. He also decided to use this medium for addressing the social cause of saving the environment. He went on to make a short film 'Do you?' which is a one-minute film and also has an address by the Academy Awards nominated director Ashutosh Gowarikar. This film was made with a budget of merely $3. This film went on and won many nominations internationally and also won the award of Best Film at Ecofest 2010. Various festivals where this film was nominated include 'Vatavaran 2009' and 'Vasundhara International Film festival 2010', Pune. The film was also screened at Ecofilms, Rodos International Film & Visual Arts Festival 2010 in Rhodes, Greece. This film was later on screened in various schools not only throughout the country but all around the globe and also on the Indian National Television Channel, Doordarshan.

Taking the 'Save Trees' cause forward, Sanyog made another short film 'Now You?', a sequel to his previous film 'Do You?' and then 'Its You?', the final part of the 'You Trilogy'.

His film Now You was a finalist at Rainforest Partnership's 'Film for the Forest' festival and was screened at George Washington Carver Museum and Cultural Center. Sanyog's fourth short film 'Cage' is based on the theme of saving jungles. He believes that the thought of saving mother nature should be inculcated at a young age for it to be from within. He also did a 30 minute long documentary on 'Bhimthadi-Women empowerment fair' for 'Agricultural Development Trust, Baramati' and 'Shardanagar', Baramati which was very well received and appreciated. He also made films on Krishi Vigyan Kendra which was specially screened for Hon. President Of India Shri Pranab Mukherji.

His latest film 'For You' is unique. A love story with an environmental message, the film was shown at various film festivals including Vasundhara Film Festival 2016. This film was a part of Official Selections for International Film Festival of Cinematic Arts, Los Angeles 2014. In 2014, The film was nominated for The Woodpecker Film Festival and Forum, Screened at the India Habitat Center 201, and was winner at 3rd Mumbai Shorts International Film Festival.

The American company Treeium on their blog published list of very best short films on the environment. The film Do You? is on the list. This film also won "Best Film Award" at Kolkata International Wildlife and Environment Film Festival 2015. The film was in association with Indian Army and was released by Indian Army on their official channels.

== Filmography ==
Year	Film	Role
2008	Do You?	Director/Producer
2010	Now You?	Director/Producer
2011	Its You?	Director/Producer
2012	Cage	Director/Producer
2014	For You	Director/Producer
2016	Armour	Director/Producer
