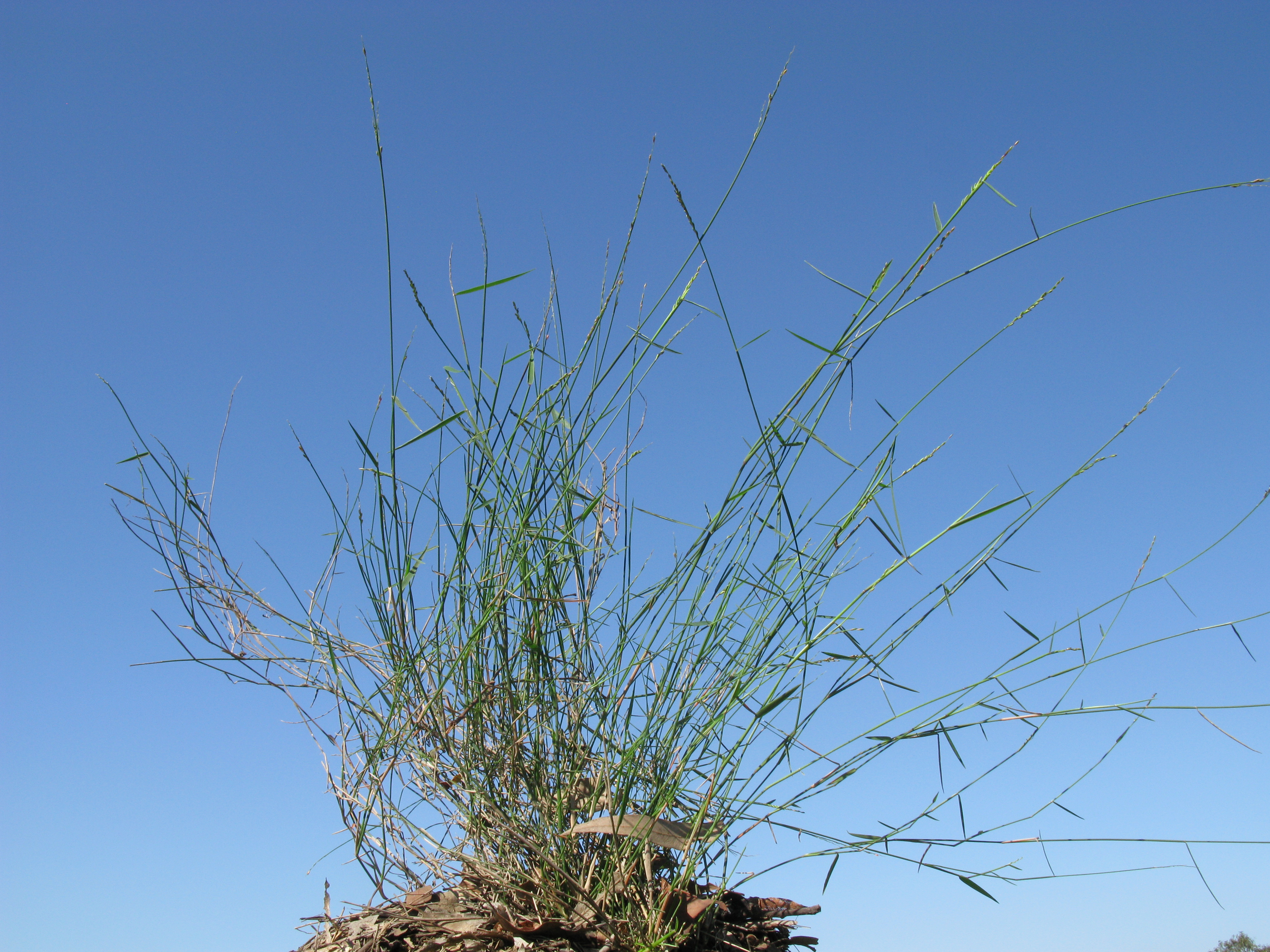

Scientific classification
- Kingdom: Plantae
- Clade: Tracheophytes
- Clade: Angiosperms
- Clade: Monocots
- Clade: Commelinids
- Order: Poales
- Family: Poaceae
- Subfamily: Panicoideae
- Genus: Entolasia
- Species: E. marginata

Binomial name
- Entolasia marginata (R.Br.) Hughes

Synonyms
- Panicum marginatum R.Br.

= Entolasia marginata =

Bordered panic grass

Species of grass

Entolasia marginata, known as the bordered panic grass, is a species of grass found in eastern Australia, tropical Asia and the Pacific region.

It can grow up to 0.8 metres tall when freestanding, but may even reach in excess of two metres tall when supported by other plants. The specific epithet marginata refers to the pale vein-like margins of the leaves. This is one of the many plants first published by Robert Brown with the type known as "(J.) v.v." It appears in his Prodromus Florae Novae Hollandiae et Insulae Van Diemen in 1810.
