= Tanzania Conservation Resource Centre =

- Formation: 2006
- Type: Non-profit organization
- Purpose: Conservation education and research support
- Headquarters: Arusha, Tanzania
- Location: Near Njiro Cinema Complex, Arusha
- Region served: Tanzania
- Services: Research logistics, conservation networking, library access
- Website: www.tzcrc.org

The Tanzania Conservation Resource Centre (CRC) is a non-profit educational and research-support organization based in Arusha, Tanzania. Founded in 2006, the Centre has a small library of primarily conservation materials (both electronic and in print) and provides services for visiting researchers and local students.

CRC has operated for over five years in Tanzania, supporting conservation and wildlife research through capacity-building and networking for local and foreign researchers and students. The Centre has an office near the Njiro cinema complex in Arusha, and provides logistical, informational and networking support.

The CRC provides a way for students to connect with researchers and their projects, and provides a database of both projects and of students seeking positions.

== Partnerships and Collaboration ==
CRC states that it provides logistical support for visiting researchers from international universities and collaborates with local institutions like TAWIRI.

== See also ==
- List of Tanzanian conservation organisations
