= Greater Blue Mountains Area =

UNESCO World Heritage Site
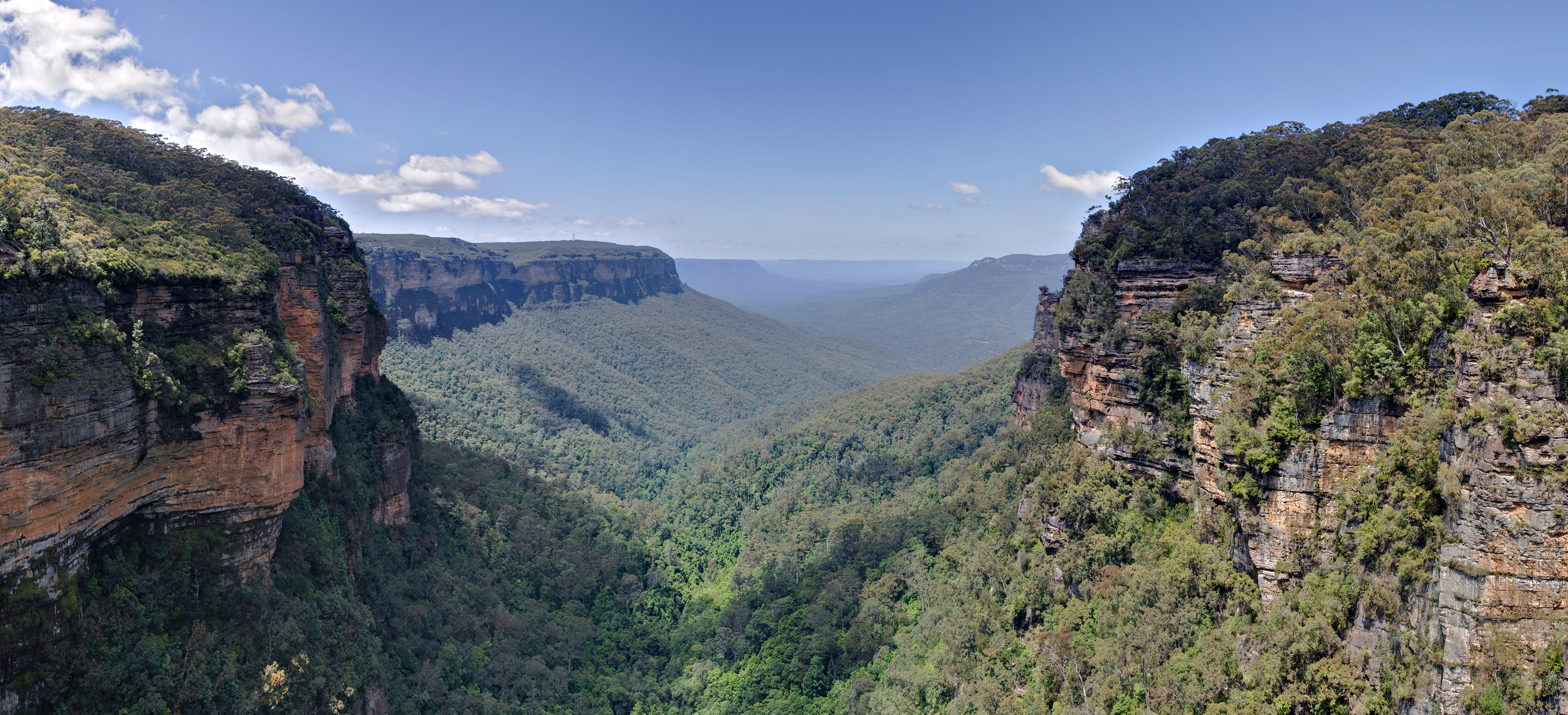
- A view over Jamison Valley, in 2008.

- Location within New South Wales Location within Australia
- Location: New South Wales, Australia
- Criteria: Natural: (ix), (x)
- Reference: 917
- Inscription: 2000 (24th Session)
- Area: 1,032,649 ha (2,551,730 acres)
- Buffer zone: 86,200 ha (213,000 acres)
- Coordinates: 33°42′S 150°0′E

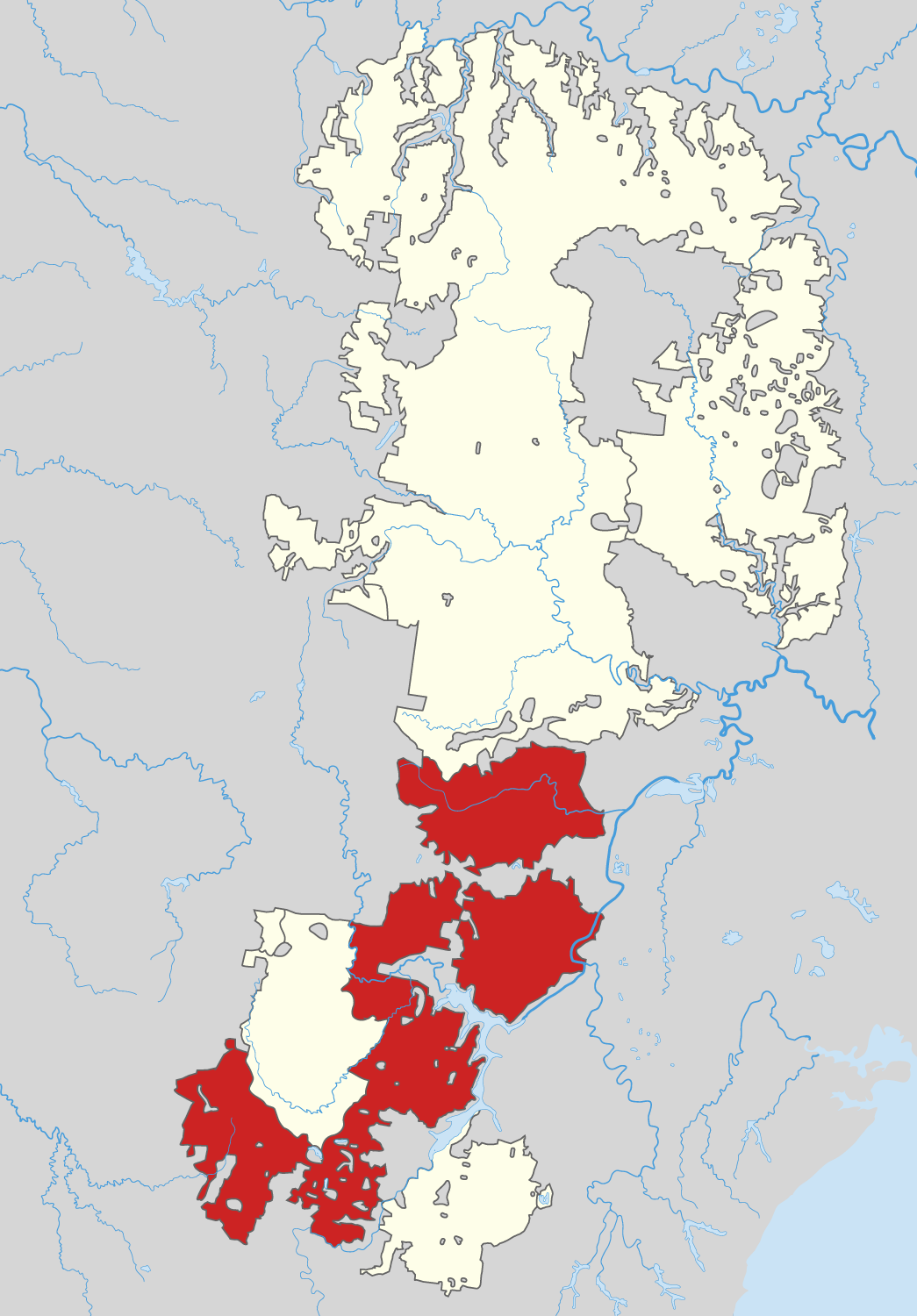
The Blue Mountains National Park, shaded in red, as part of the larger Greater Blue Mountains World Heritage Area.

The Greater Blue Mountains Area is a World Heritage Site located in the Blue Mountains of New South Wales, Australia. The 1,032,649-hectare (2,551,730-acre) area was placed on the World Heritage List at the 24th Session of the World Heritage Committee, held in Cairns in 2000.

== Etymology ==
When the atmospheric temperature of the region rises the essential oil produced from the eucalyptus species evaporates and disperses in the air, causing visible spectra of sunlight to scatter. The scattering causes the shorter wavelength colors (blue) to propagate more than the longer wavelength colors (red). This causes reflections from the mountains to appear bluish to human eyes, giving the mountain region its signature name, "Blue Mountains".

== Description ==
The Greater Blue Mountains Area consists of 10,300 square kilometres (4,000 sq mi) of mostly forested landscape on a sandstone plateau, 60 to 180 kilometres (37 to 112 mi) inland from the Sydney central business district. The area includes vast expanses of wilderness and is equivalent in area to Lebanon.

The property, which includes eight protected areas in two blocks separated by a transportation and urban development corridor, is made up of seven national parks as well as the famous Jenolan Caves Karst Conservation Reserve. These are the Blue Mountains National Park, Wollemi National Park, Yengo National Park, Nattai National Park, Kanangra-Boyd National Park, Gardens of Stone National Park, and Thirlmere Lakes National Park.

The area does not contain mountains in the conventional sense but is described as a deeply incised sandstone plateau, rising from less than 100 metres (330 ft) above sea level to 1,300 metres (4,300 ft) at the highest point. There are basalt outcrops on the higher ridges. According to the Australian Department of Climate Change, Energy, the Environment and Water (DCCEEW), this plateau is thought to have enabled the survival of a rich diversity of plant and animal life by providing a refuge from climatic changes during recent geological history. It is particularly noted for its wide and balanced representation of eucalypt habitats from wet and dry sclerophyll, mallee heathlands, as well as localized swamps, wetlands, and grassland. Ninety-one species of eucalypts (13 percent of the global total) occur in the Greater Blue Mountains Area. Twelve of these are believed to occur only in the Sydney sandstone region.

== Flora ==
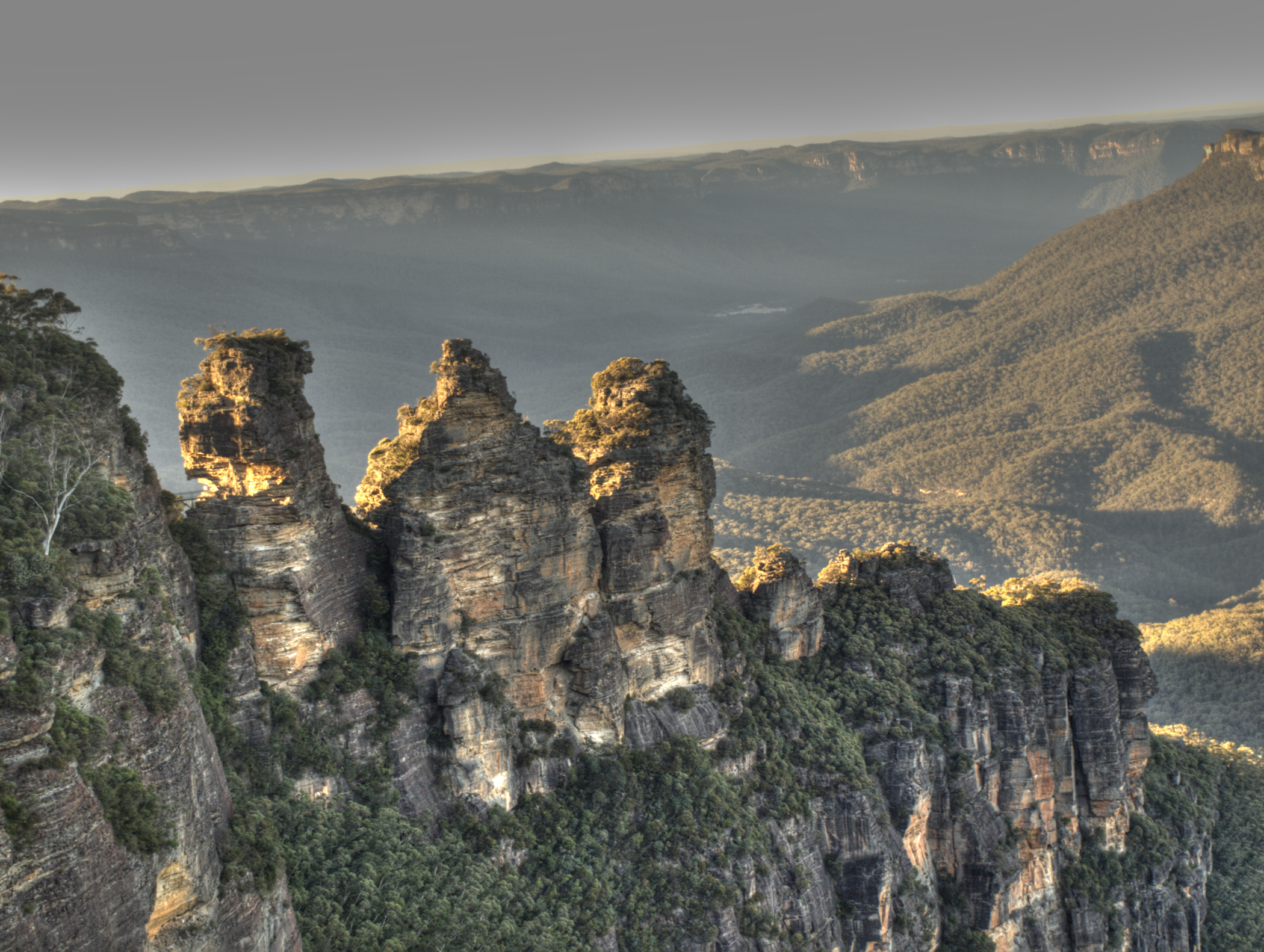
Three Sisters, Blue Mountains National Park

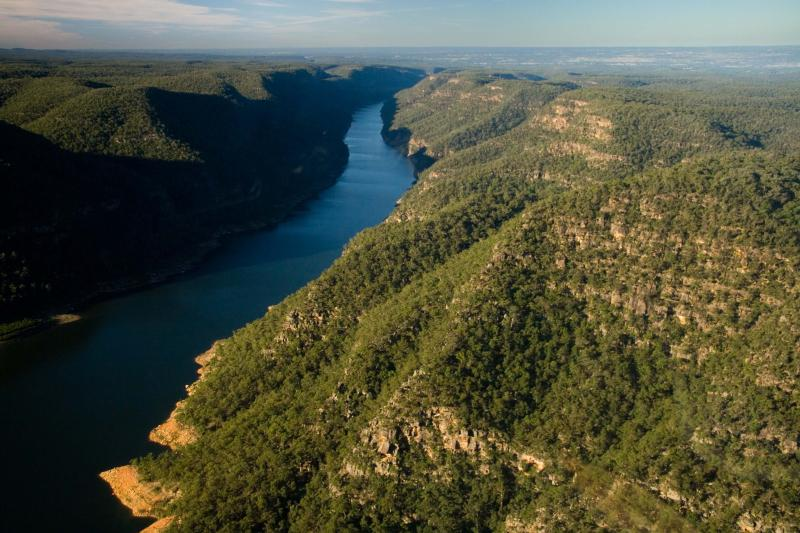
Lake Burragorang

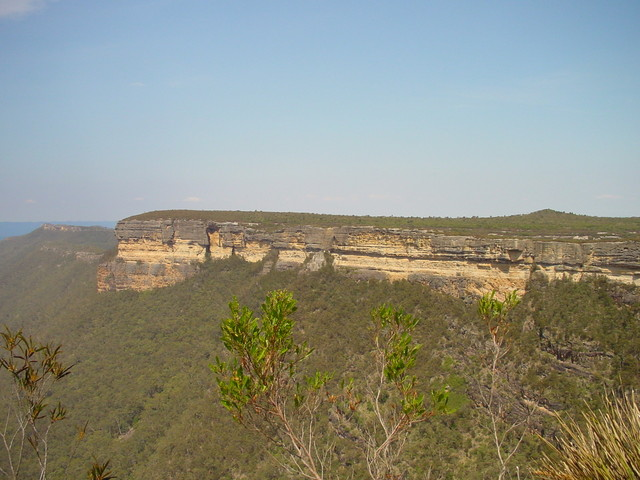
Kanangra Walls at Kanangra-Boyd National Park

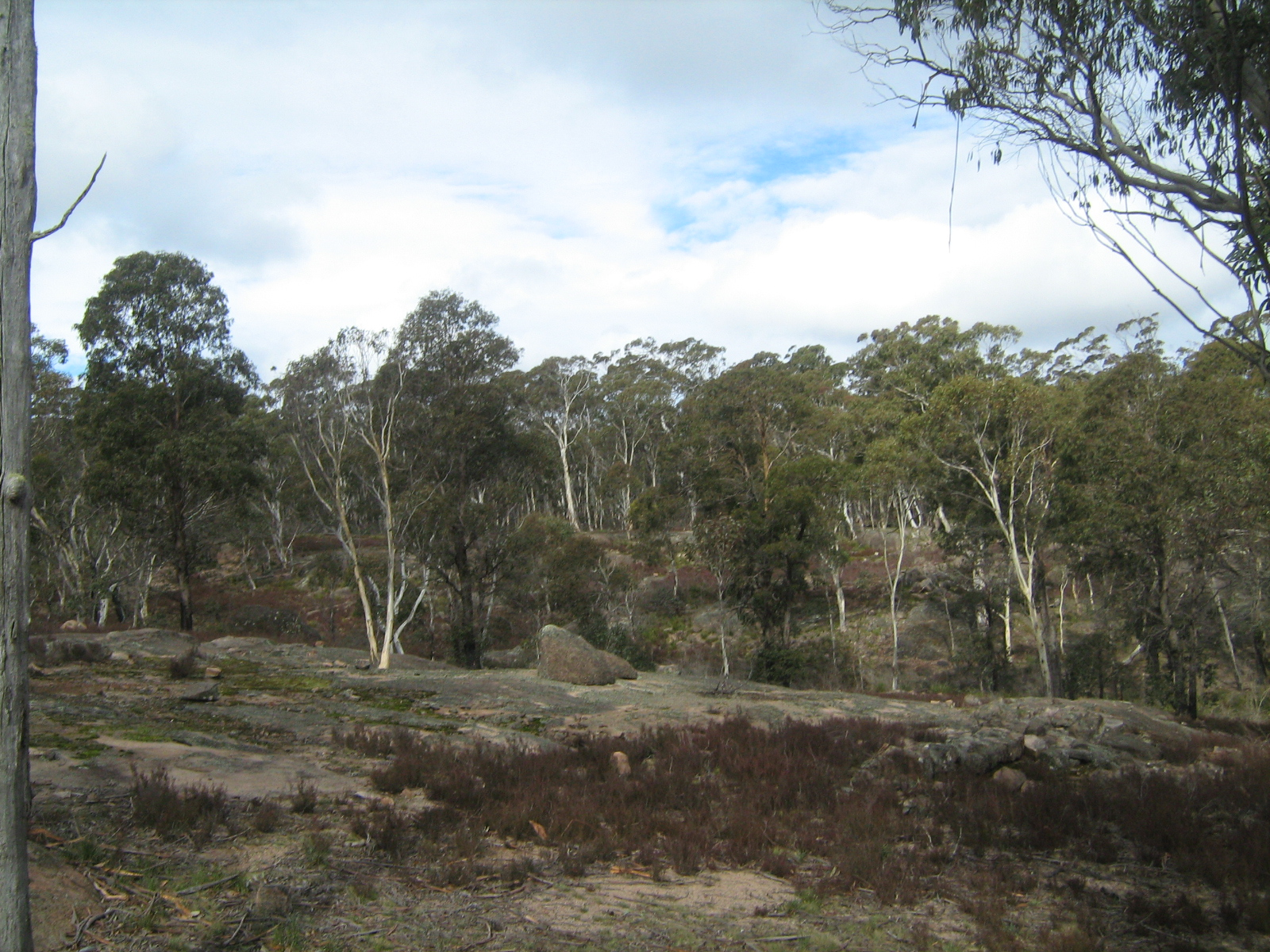
Forest near Boyd River

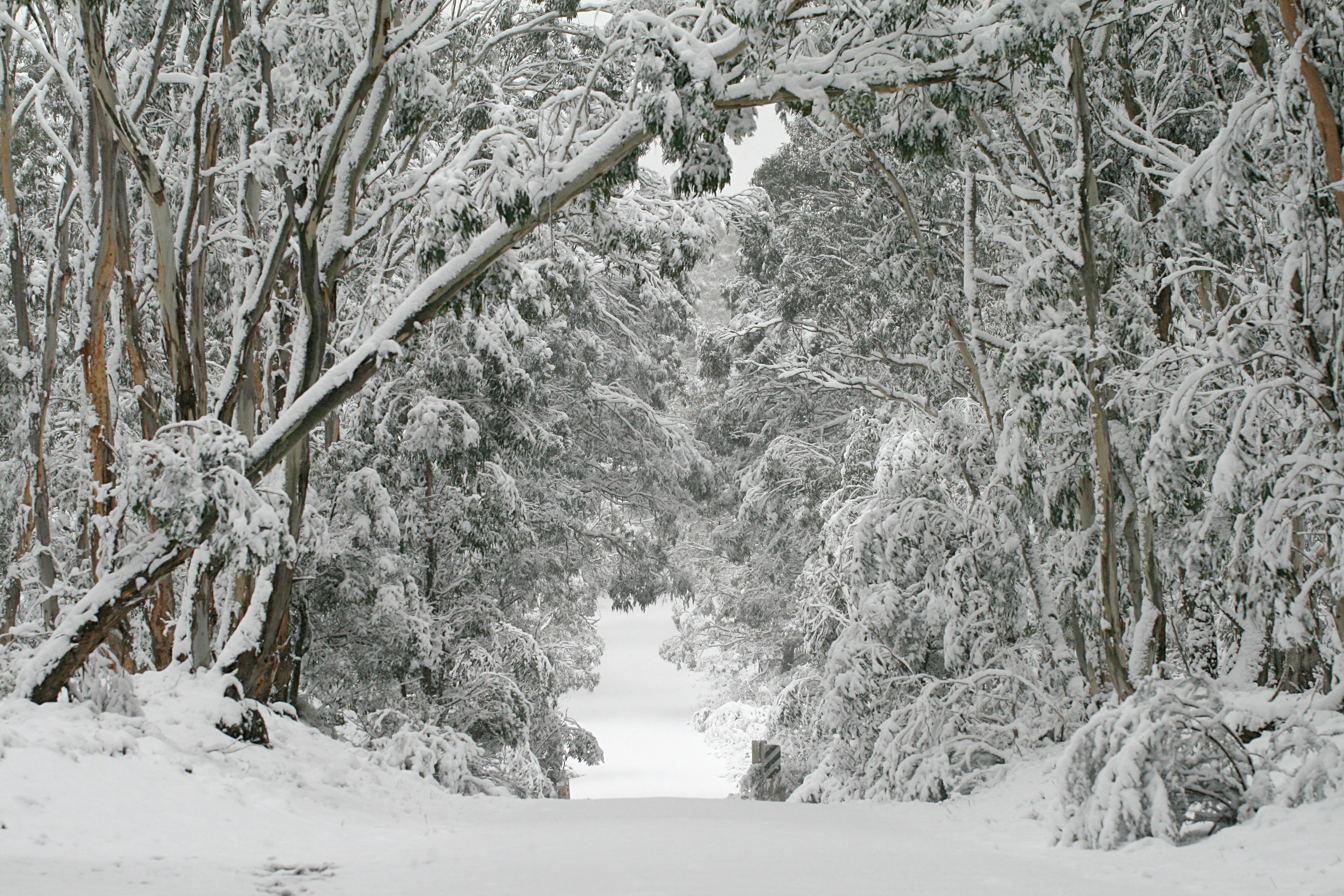
Boyd River campground in winter (Kanangra-Boyd National Park)

The area has been known as a natural laboratory for studying the evolution of eucalypts. The largest area of high diversity of eucalypts on the continent is located in southeast Australia. The Greater Blue Mountains Area contains 13% of all the world’s eucalypt species, with a definite list of 96 species recorded (55 widespread, and 41 restricted).

As well as supporting such a significant proportion of the world's eucalypt species, the area provides examples of the range of structural adaptations of the eucalypts to Australian environments. These vary from tall forests at the margins or rainforests in the deep valleys, through open forests and woodlands, to shrublands of stunted mallees on the exposed tablelands.

The Greater Blue Mountains Area also contains relict species of global significance. The most famous of these is the Wollemi pine, a "living fossil" discovered in 1994 that dates back to the age of the dinosaurs. Thought to have been extinct for millions of years, the few surviving trees of this ancient species are known only from three small populations located in remote, inaccessible gorges within the area. The Wollemi pine is one of the world's rarest pine species.

== Fauna ==
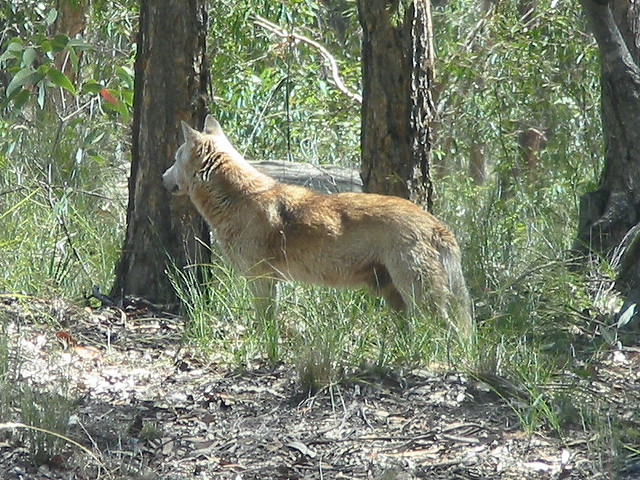
A dingo at Yengo National Park

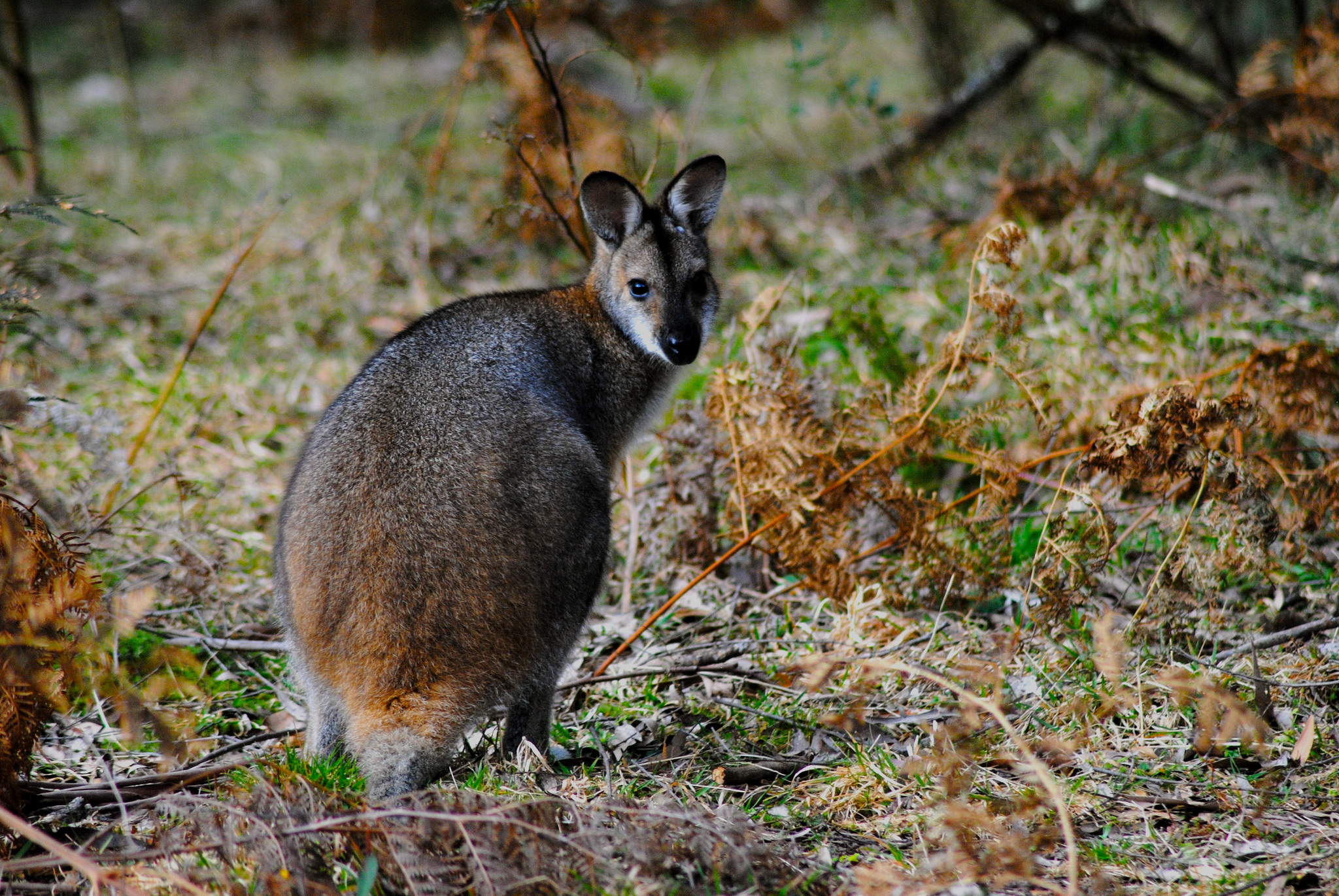
Red-necked wallaby in the Blue Mountains

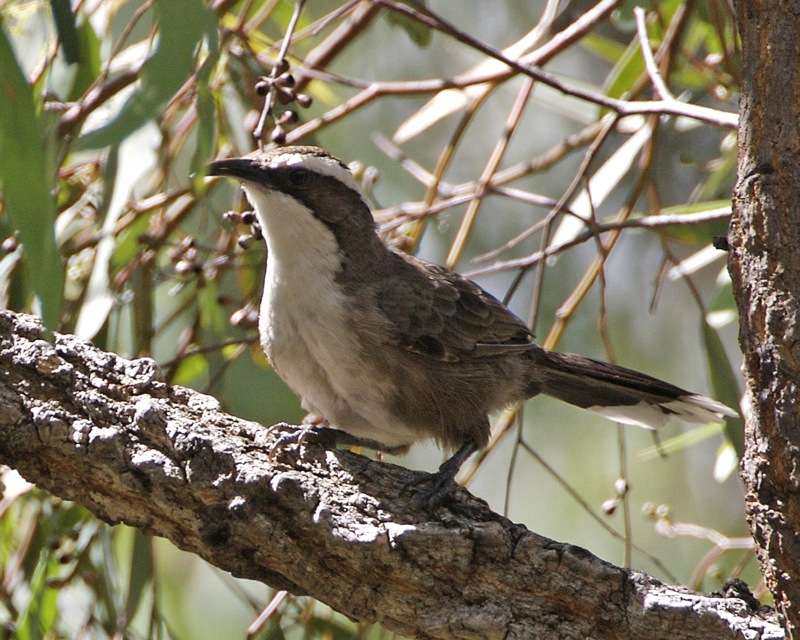
White-browed babbler

More than 400 different kinds of animals live within the rugged gorges and tablelands of the Greater Blue Mountains Area. These include threatened or rare species of conservation significance, such as the tiger quoll, the koala, the yellow-bellied glider, and the long-nosed potoroo, as well as rare reptiles and amphibians including the green and golden bell frog and the Blue Mountain water skink.

The largest predator in the area is the dingo. These wild dogs hunt for grey kangaroos and other prey.

The greater Blue Mountains region has been identified by BirdLife International as an Important Bird Area (IBA) because it supports a high proportion of the global populations of the range-restricted rockwarbler as well as populations of flame robins, diamond firetails and pilotbirds. The endangered regent honeyeater is seen there regularly. It is also a migration bottleneck for yellow-faced honeyeaters.

== UNESCO listing ==
The Greater Blue Mountains Area was unanimously listed as a World Heritage Area by UNESCO on 29 November 2000. It thus became the fourth area in New South Wales to be listed. The area totals roughly 10,300 square kilometres (4,000 sq mi), including the Blue Mountains, Kanangra-Boyd, Wollemi, Gardens of Stone, Yengo, Nattai and Thirlmere Lakes National Parks, plus the Jenolan Caves Karst Conservation Reserve. A buffer zone of 86,200 hectares (213,000 acres) lies outside the protected area.

== See also ==
- Blue Mountains (New South Wales)
- Blue Mountains National Park
- Blue Mountains and Southern Highlands Basalt Forests
- Blue Mountains Shale Cap Forest
