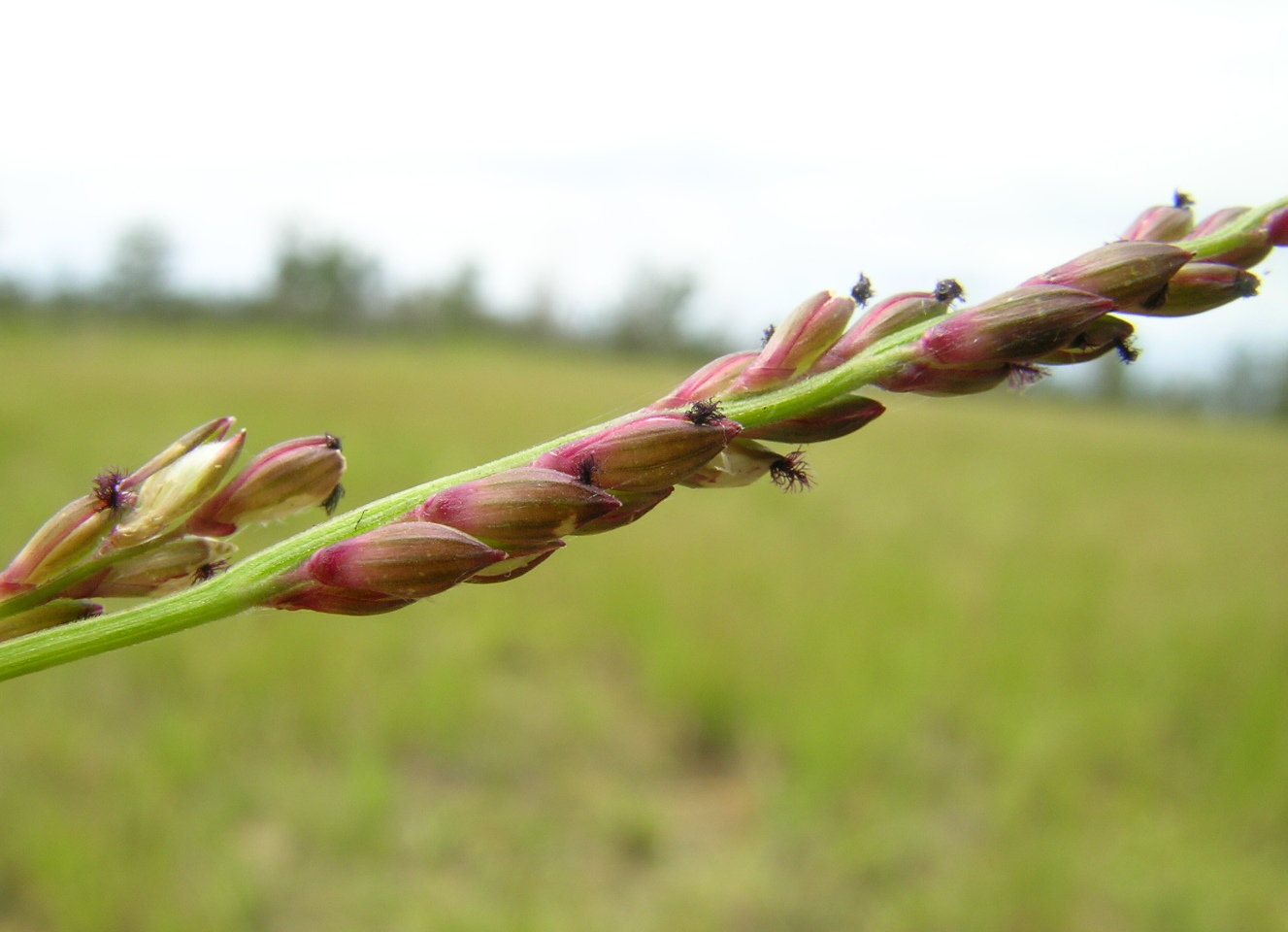
- Entolasia marginata

Scientific classification
- Kingdom: Plantae
- Clade: Tracheophytes
- Clade: Angiosperms
- Clade: Monocots
- Clade: Commelinids
- Order: Poales
- Family: Poaceae
- Subfamily: Panicoideae
- Supertribe: Panicodae
- Tribe: Paniceae
- Subtribe: Boivinellinae
- Genus: Entolasia; Stapf

= Entolasia =

Genus of grasses

Entolasia is a genus of African, Australian, and Papuasian plants in the grass family.

They are rhizomatous perennials.

Species

- Entolasia imbricata - bungoma grass - central + southern Africa
- Entolasia marginata - bordered panic, Australian panicgrass - New Guinea, Queensland, New South Wales, Victoria
- Entolasia minutifolia - Queensland
- Entolasia olivacea - tropical + southern Africa
- Entolasia stricta - wiry panic - New Guinea, Queensland, New South Wales, Victoria
- Entolasia whiteana - Queensland, New South Wales
