= Swamps of the Blue Mountains =

Peat swamps in New South Wales, Australia

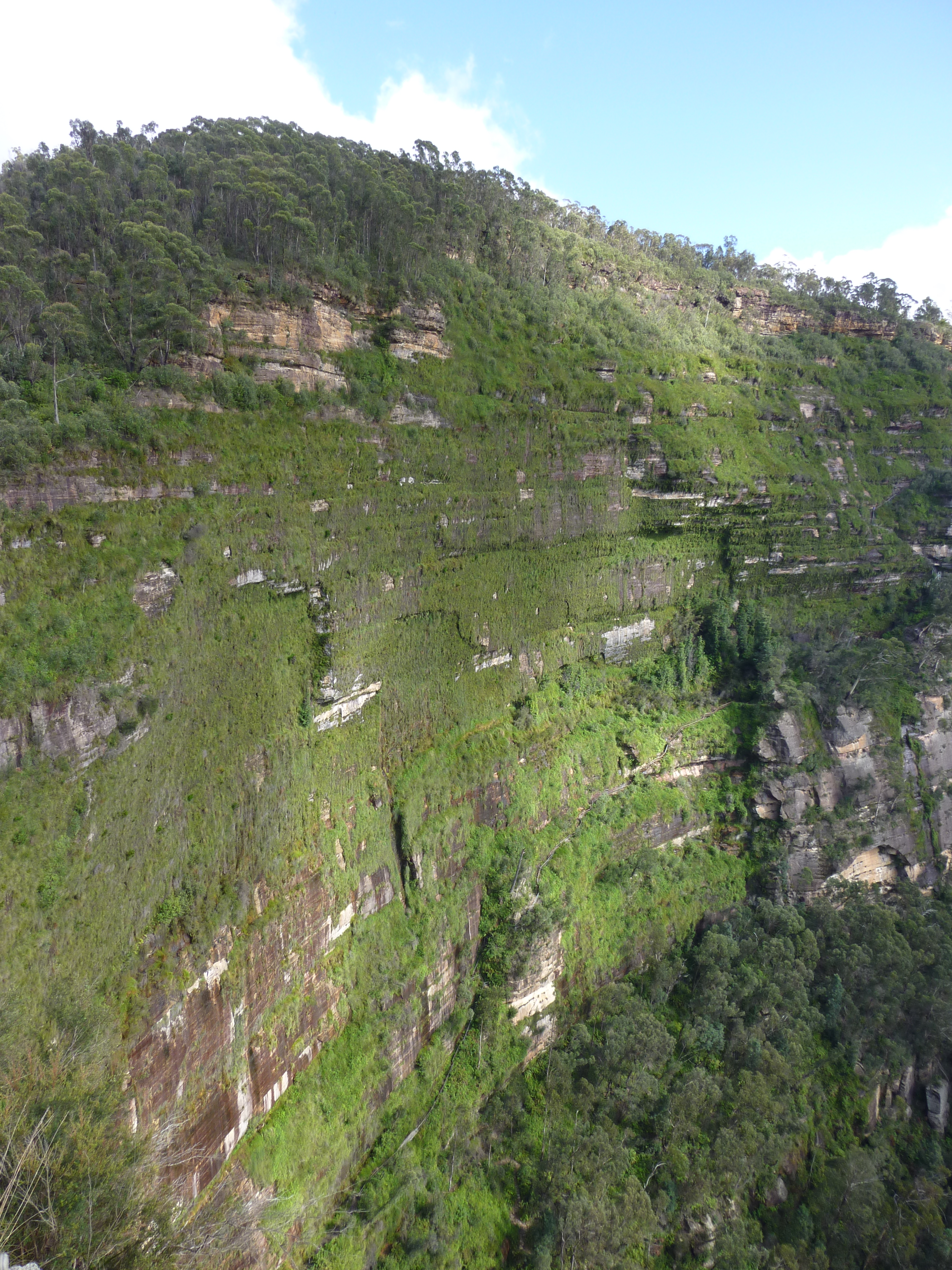
Hanging swamps

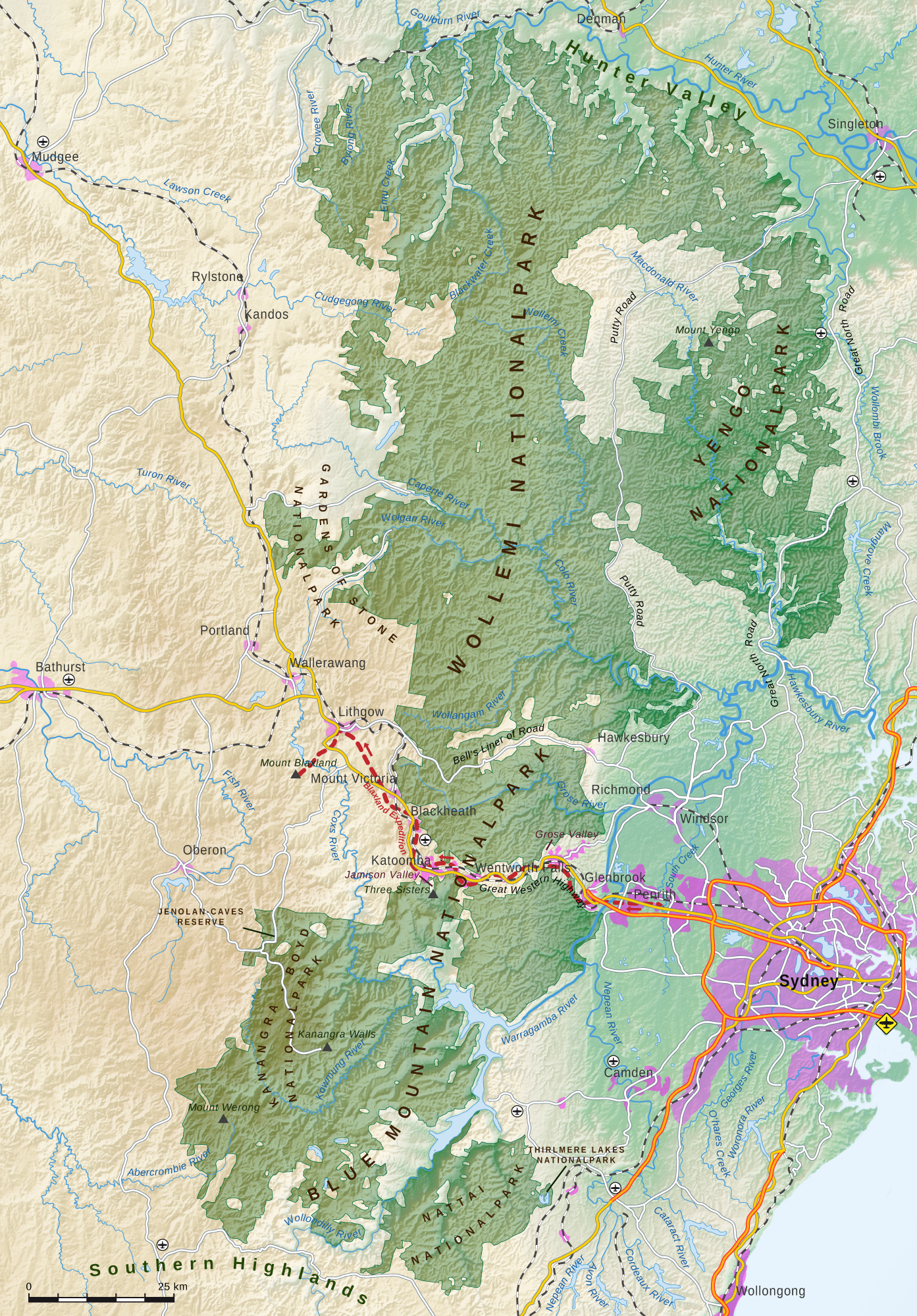
Blue-Mountains World Heritage (de)

The swamp communities of the Blue Mountains are a geographically dispersed group of ecologically endangered peat swamp communities, spanning multiple parts of the World Heritage-listed Blue Mountains National Park in New South Wales, Australia.

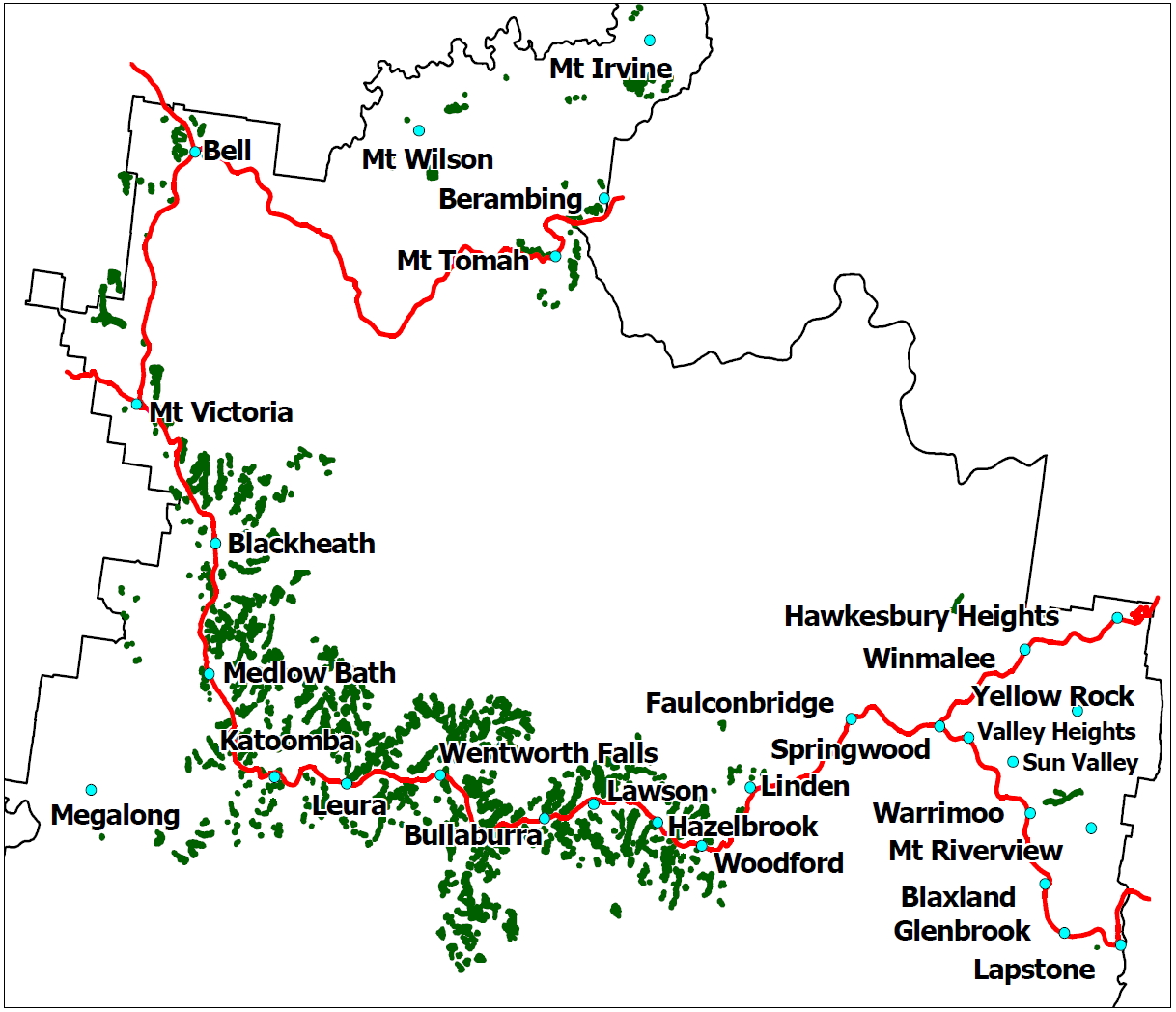
Hanging swamps located within the Blue Mountains

== History ==
The swamps were first listed as endangered ecological communities in 2004, under the Environment Protection and Biodiversity Conservation Act 1999 and the Threatened Species Conservation Act 1995 (NSW). The swamp communities are usually found at altitudes ranging between 500 and 1,000 metres (1,600 and 3,300 ft) above sea level. They comprise less than 3,000 hectares (7,400 acres) or around 3% of the total heritage area of the Blue Mountains National park.

It is believed that swamps such as these formed around 15,000 years ago. The Blue Mountain swamps exist within low‐lying sites on valley floors (valley swamps) and also as hanging swamps which occur on steep hillsides and around the headwaters of creeks.

== Varieties ==
The swamp communities exist with different variability, and may be considered valley swamps, hanging swamps, or a combination of both. Hanging swamps are named for their appearance of literally hanging off cliff faces or steep hillsides. Swamp communities receive water from different pathways, with water coming from groundwater, feeder streams, or a combination of both of these sources.

The valley floor swamp communities form typically because of the predominantly sandstone plateau. This substrate allows the percolation of water in poorly drained stream headways.

The hanging swamps are formed via groundwater that seeps through permeable sandstone layers, which then as a consequence of the rock composition, is trapped by layers of claystone, ironstone and shale, and proceeds to be channelled to the surface. This process initiates a path of constant moisture, allowing hanging swamps to form peat in an anaerobic environment. The process of thick peat formation takes millennia.

== Environment ==
The Blue Mountains on average typically receives greater than 1,000 millimetres (39 in) of rainfall per year; the low subsurface permeability, combined with the slowed runoff, assists in the formation of these biodiverse swamp communities in Blue Mountains.

The composition of the soils varies from yellow to grey-yellow loam soils to a black mineral peat. Soil composition depends largely on the level of water logging.

The swamps play an important hydrological role within the mountains landscapes, controlling and regulating the movement of water. The sponge-like nature of the swamps which sustains flows into surrounding streams, has multiple effects on the water quality reaching these streams. Swamps help reduce water turbidity, and enhance overall stream water quality. Some plant species with specialized habitats rely on the ongoing seepage from the hanging swamps for their survival. Examples of these are Epacris hamiltonii and Microstrobos fitzgeraldii.

== Elsewhere ==
Australia has other peatlands and swamplands that share some characteristic with the Blue Mountains swamps; these swamps are found in the NSW North Coast, South East Corner, Southern Tablelands and Australian Alps regions. However compared to the Blue Mountains, other swamp areas contain a lower diversity of sclerophyllous shrub species, and a higher diversity of plants that generally occur on substrates with greater fertility, compared to sandstone. These plants are soft-leaved sedges, grasses, and herbs.

== Flora ==
The Blue Mountains swamps communities contain a high level of flora biodiversity, primarily mixtures of sedges and shrubs with sclerophyllous foliage with some smaller trees. The sizes of typically occurring shrubs are generally between 0.5–2 metres (1 ft 8 in – 6 ft 7 in). Ground cover varies depending on the topography of the swamp area. Sedge heights are usually below 1 metre (3 ft 3 in), with sclerophyllous grasses densely packed providing a large amount of ground cover. Within open areas between the grasses and sedges, there are smaller shrubs, ferns, forbs and occasional trees.

As each swamp community has been subjected to different localised events such as fires, there is localised variation of plant species within the swamps in both the structure of the vegetation, such as closed heath or open heath scrub species.

The swamps are diverse in flora species, with a number being endemic to NSW, and/or The Blue Mountains.

=== Shrubs ===
- Baeckea linifolia
- Leptospermum juniperinum
- Hakea teretifolia
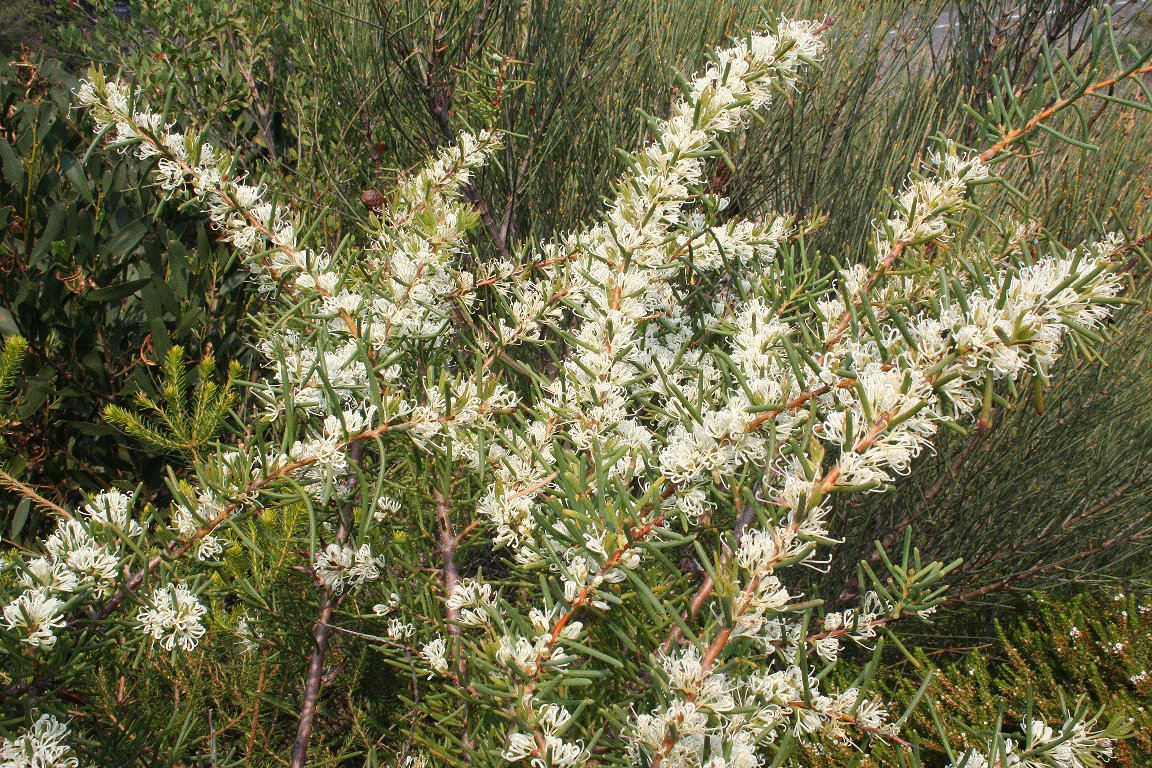
  Hakea teretifolia 3 Kurnell smaller
- L. grandifolium
- Grevillea acanthifolia subsp. Acanthifolia
- L. polygalifolium
- Banksia spinulosa
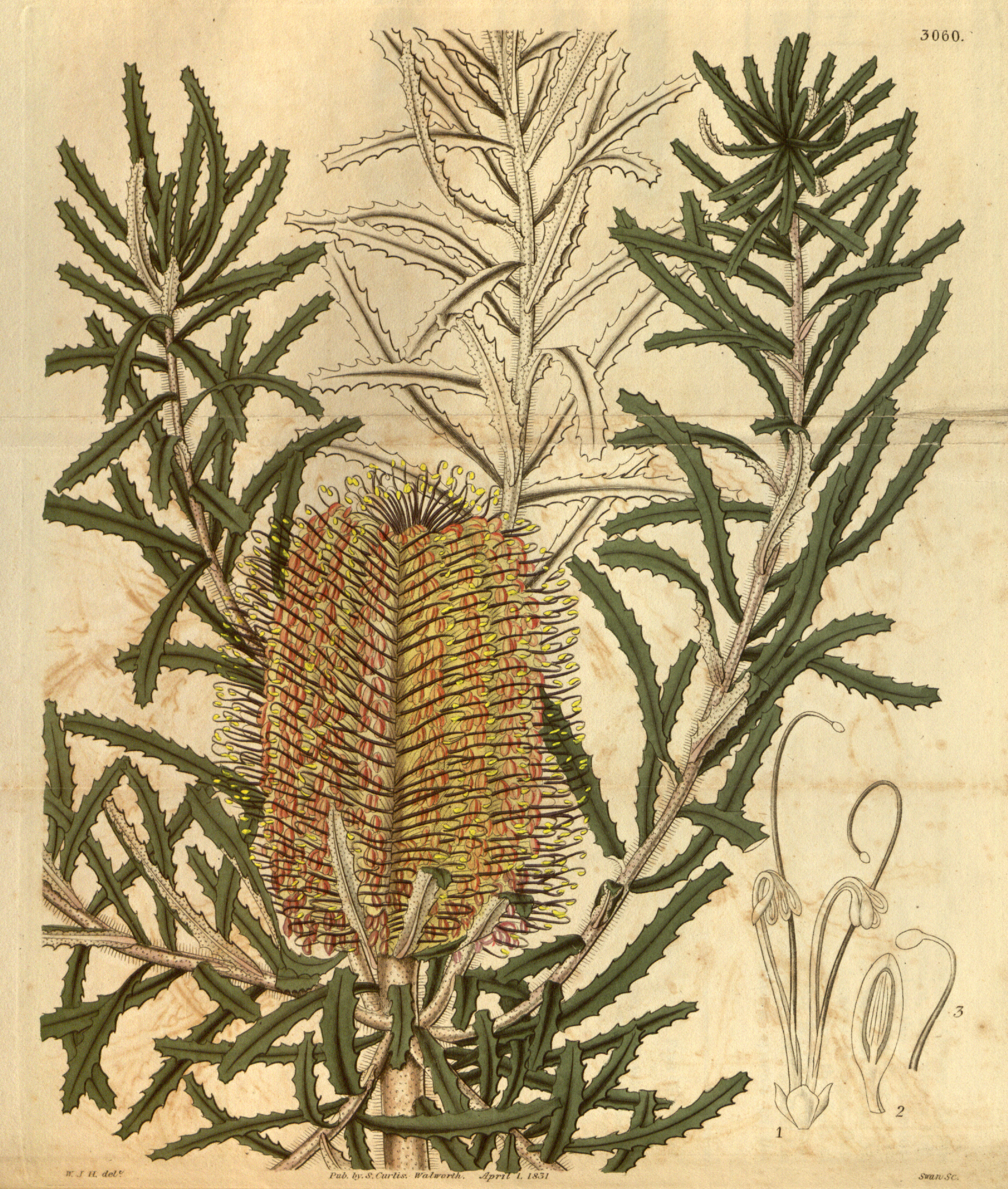
  Curtis's Botanical Magazine, Plate 3060 (Volume 58, 1831)
- Almaleea incurvata
- Epacris obtusifolia''
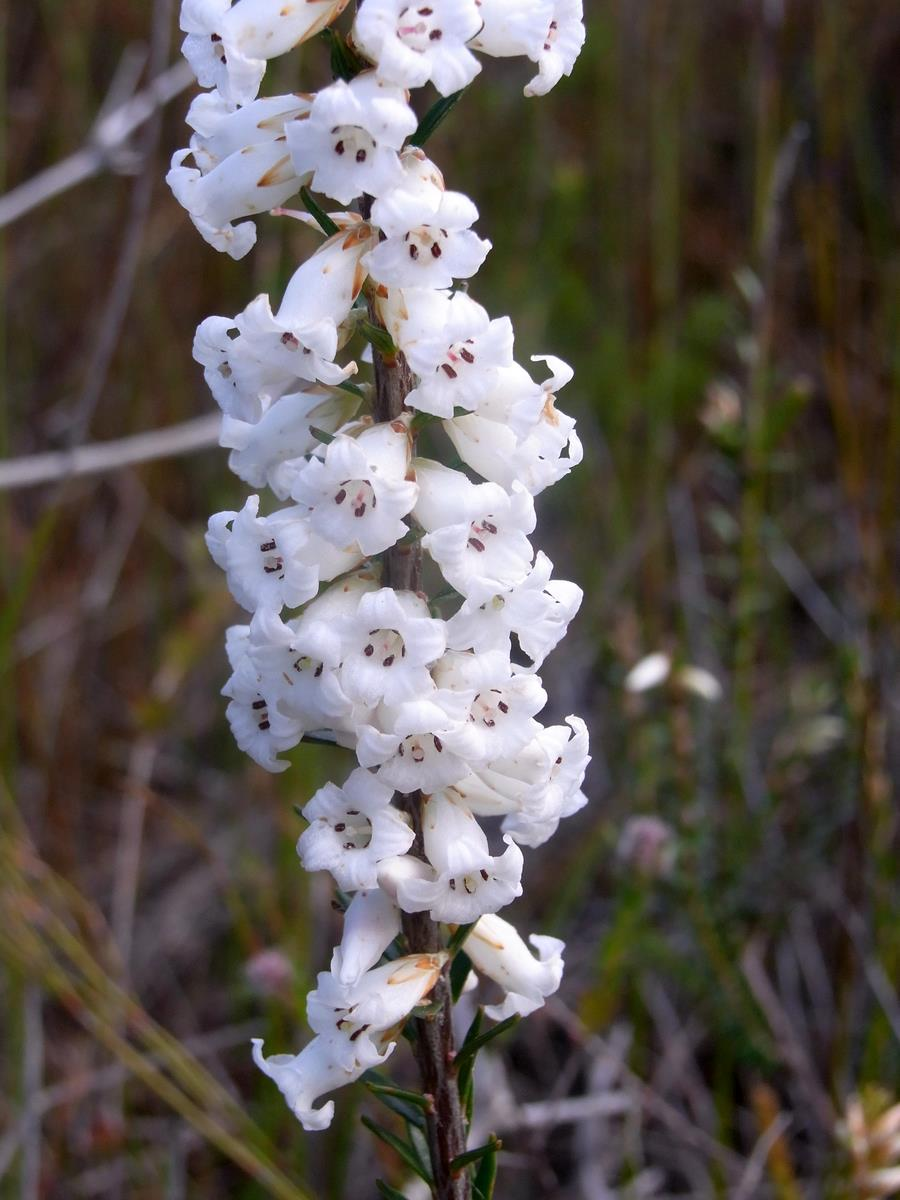
  Flowering heath Elvina track
- Sprengelia incarnata
- Dampiera stricta
- Mirbelia rubifolia
- Gonocarpus teucrioides
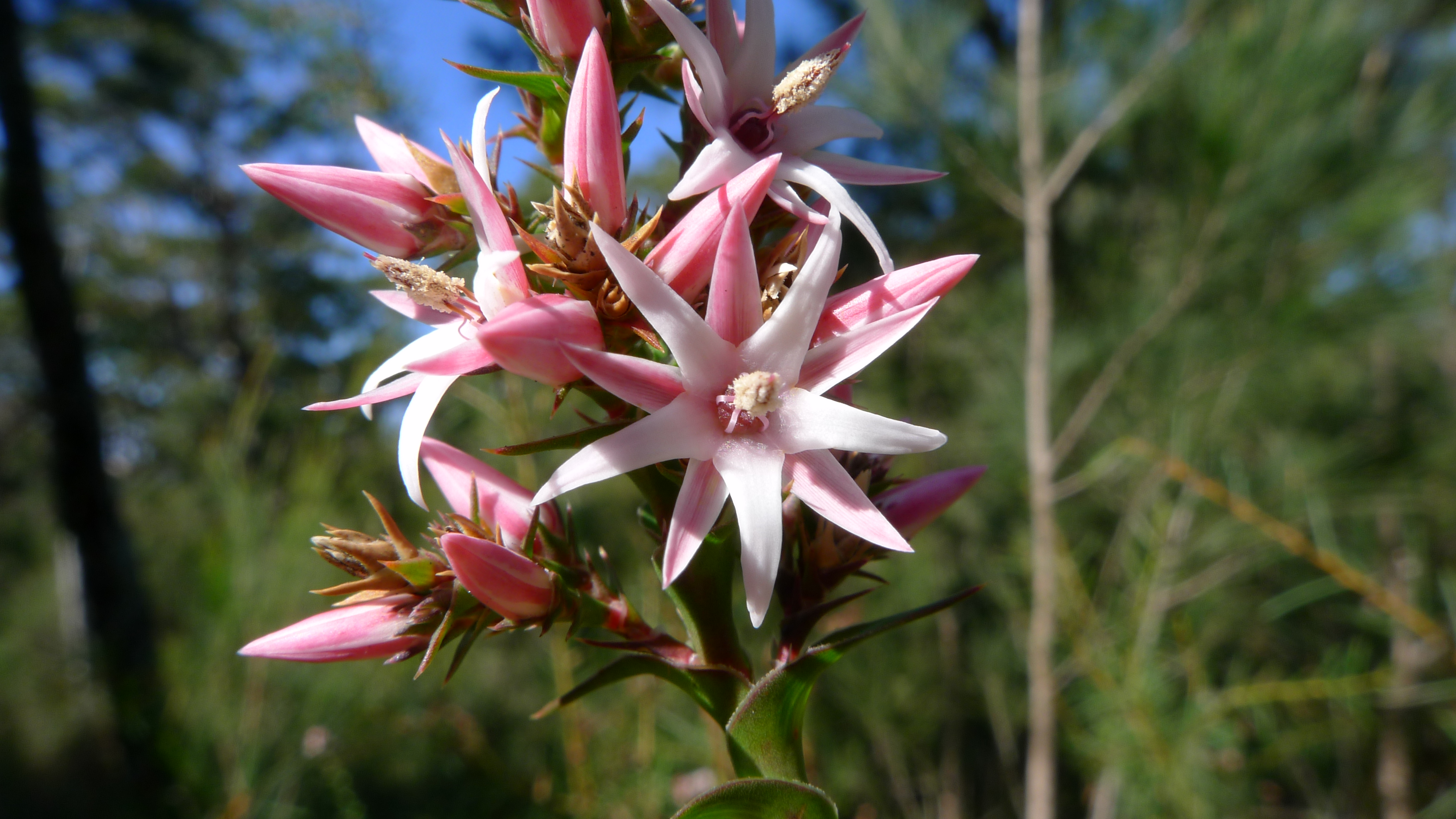
  Pink swamp heath (6076533444)
- Almaleea incurvata (endemic to the Blue Mountains)
- Grevillea acanthifolia subsp. Acanthifolia (endemic to NSW)
- Olearia quercifolia (endemic to the Blue Mountains)
- Symphionema montanum (endemic to NSW)
- Carex klaphakei (endemic to the Blue Mountains, species threatened)
- Pultenaea glabra (endemic to NSW, species threatened)

=== Sedges and rushes ===
- Gymnoschoenus sphaerocephalus
- Lepidosperma limicola
- Ptilothrix deusta
- Lepyrodia scariosa

=== Grasses ===
- Entolasia stricta
- Tetrarrhena turfosa
- Acacia ptycoclada (endemic to the Blue Mountains)
- Notochloe microdon (endemic to the Blue Mountains)

=== Ferns ===
- Gleichenia spp.

=== Carnivorous Plants ===
- Drosera binata

=== Trees ===
- Eucalyptus copulans (endemic to the Blue Mountains, critically endangered)

== Fauna ==
Fauna is also diverse with the swamps supporting a range of vertebrate and invertebrate species including insects, birds, amphibians, reptiles and marsupials. According to the NSW office of Environment and Heritage, there has never been a systematic fauna survey carried out across all of the swamp communities. However, there are several rare and endangered species that have been recorded living permanently or on a transient basis within them.

=== Vertebrates ===
- The Water Skink (Eulamprus leuraensis) (Endemic to the Blue Mountains, Threatened)
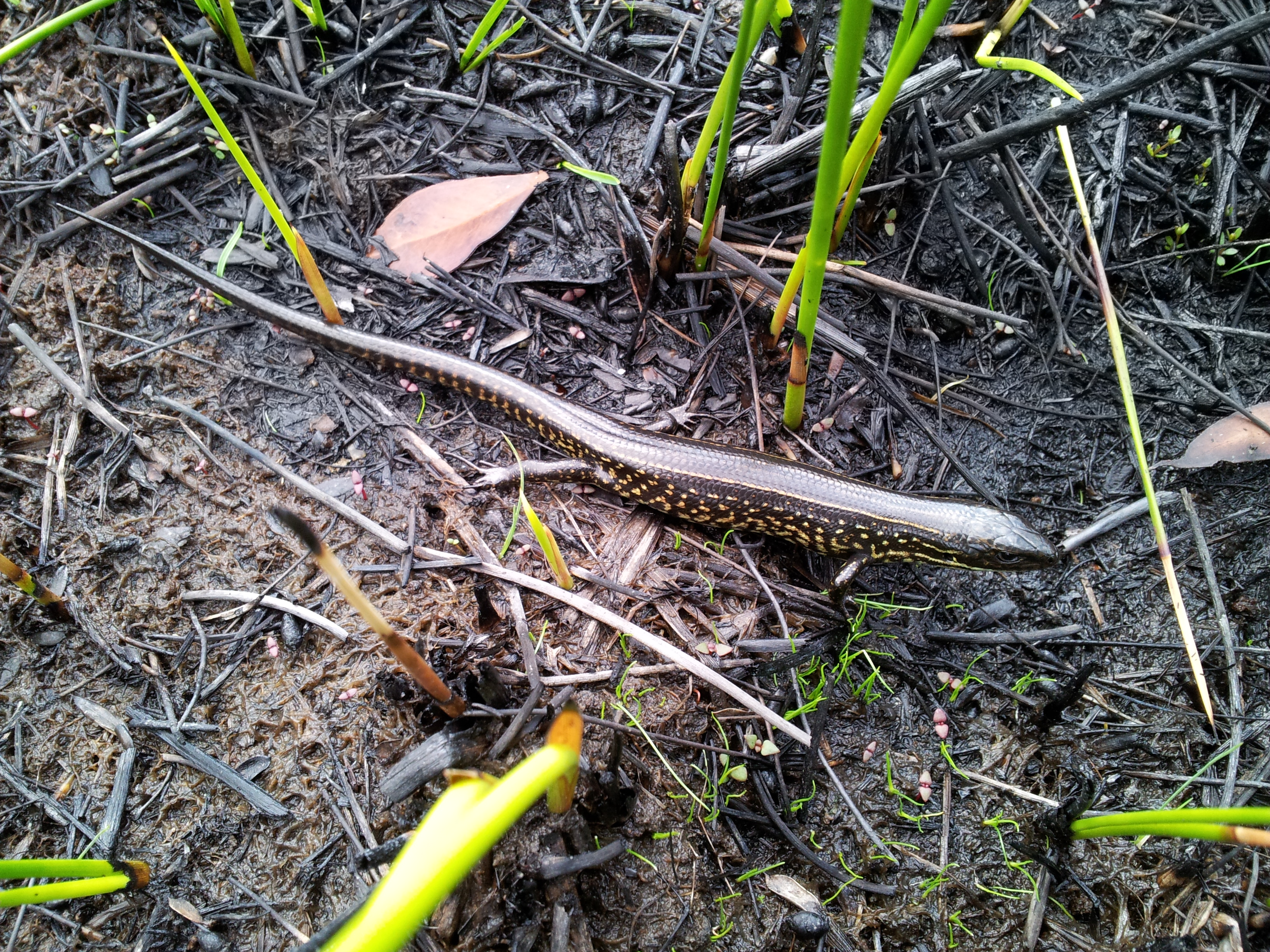
  Eulamprus leuraensis - The Blue Mountains Water Skink
- Giant Burrowing Frog (Heleioporus australiacus) (Threatened)
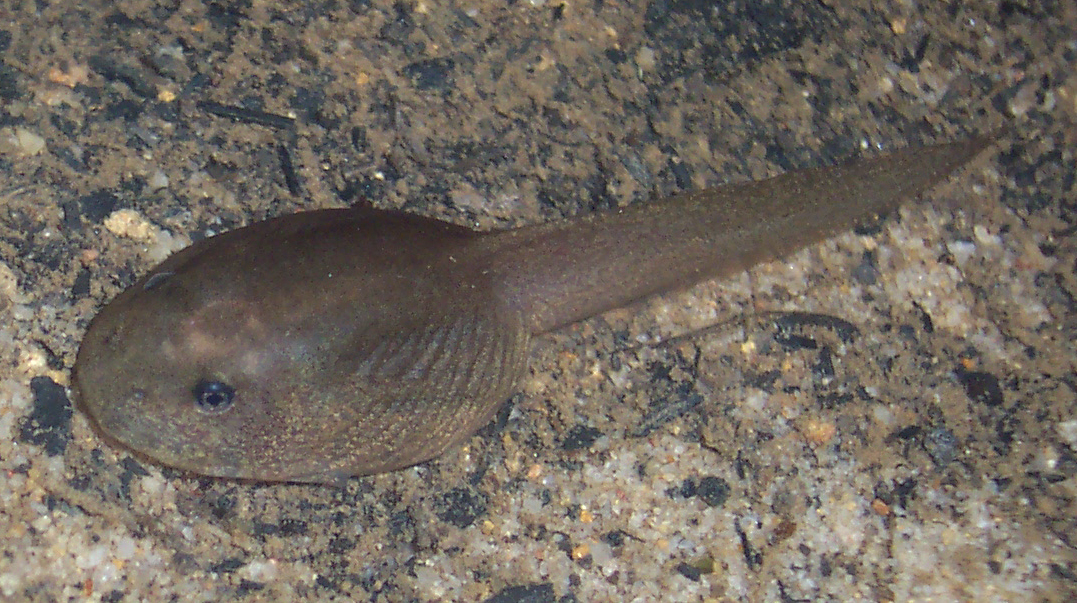
  Giant Burrowing Frog (Heleioporus australiacus) tadpole
- Red-crowned Toadlet (Pseudophryne australis) (Threatened)
- Southern Emu Wren (Stipiturus malachurus)
- Lewin's Rail (Dryolimnas pectoralis)
- Buff-banded Rail (Gallirallus phillippensis)
- Eastern Dwarf tree frog (Litoria L. fallax)
- Mustard-bellied Snake (Drysdalia rhodogaster)
- Beautiful Firetail (Stagonopleura bella)
- Black-chinned Honeyeater (eastern subspecies) (threatened)

=== Invertebrates ===
The Giant Dragonfly (Petalura gigantea) (Endangered)

This list is not complete; several plant and animal species are not yet listed here.

== Environmental threats and issues ==
With the ongoing urbanization of the Blue mountains city, ecological pressures on the swamp communities have been growing over the past 50 years, several threats have been identified as significant to the ongoing future health of the swamp communities.

Current threats have been identified as:

=== Sediment deposition, tunnelling and channelisation from storm water discharges ===
‘Alteration to the natural flow regimes of rivers, streams and their floodplains and wetlands is listed as a Key Threatening Process under the Threatened Species Conservation Act’. The expansion of roads within the Blue Mountains urban areas have increased both the volume and the velocities of which the associated runoff flowing into surrounding bush land areas.

This higher rate of flow is causing increased erosion, and leading to the buildup of sediment, which can result in damage to swamp community soil and associated ecosystems, including flora and fauna in the surrounding areas. The steeper the areas, the greater the channels and sedimentation.

=== Nutrient enrichment ===
This increased water flow has a propensity to assist with a larger volume of both nutrients and other urban content such as pesticides, particularly from urban gardens, lawns and golf courses, motor vehicles and industrial infrastructure has also been identified as causing detrimental effects to the swampland communities by the addition of these chemicals that wouldn’t normally be found. As urbanization continues to expand, this threat is likely to increase.

=== Clearing for urban development ===
It has been estimated by the Blue Mountains City Council, that around 250 hectares (620 acres) of swamp community occurs within catchment zones currently disturbed by urbanization.

Damage to vegetation and the concentration of surface water from increased flows as a result of clearing for urban development, is a cause of erosion and sedimentation. Tracks for walking and the use of off-road vehicles are also impacting the soils and contributing to their degradation. These types of activities can lead to the compaction of the soils around and within the swamp communities.

The Blue Mountains City Council has identified several walking tracks that have shown signs of degradation from walking and other outdoor human activities, as well as off-road vehicles around areas containing these significant swamps. Areas noted are between Lawson and Medlow Bath, as well as Mount Hay, all are currently assigned a moderate threat level, in regards to the threat to the ecological function of the swamps. However these have also been flagged as likely to face growing larger threats as continued urbanisation expands over the next several decades.

=== Mowing, filling or grazing ===
Some privately owned land areas have been mowed, filled or allowed to be used for grazing in areas of swampland. (BMCC) Although these practices are rare, these types of activities have been recognised as severely detrimental on the swamp ecosystems.

=== Water extraction (bores, tapping natural springs and building dams) ===
Water extraction by tapping into the natural hydrology of the swamps adversely affects the storage of water within them, and subsequent downstream flows. Tapping or boring is an environmental issue that has been identified as significant threat to these endangered ecological communities.

=== Fire, both ‘wild’ and controlled hazard reduction ===
Frequent fire critically disrupts life cycle processes in plants and animals and as a cause of loss of vegetation structure and composition was listed as a key threatening process on Schedule 3 of the Threatened Species Conservation Act 1995.

Anthropological climate change has the potential to bring extreme weather events such as drought, but particularly large fires, which have been shown to be potentially devastating to peat bogs and swamps. As there is less than 3,000 hectares (7,400 acres) of swamp in the Blue Mountains area, and most of it is fragmented between communities, it is also highly susceptible to ecological edge effects.

Bushfire hazard reduction, controlled burning-off, is practised to protect urban areas within the Mountains; however it has been shown to have potentially disturbing effects on the swamps. Fires' consumption of peat within the swamps is particularly damaging, as these substances take many years to recover.

Bushfires can also lead to severe erosion and channeling via post-fire runoff, destroying vegetation and subsoil rhizomes from living plants. An example of localized erosion occurred in Hazelbrook following heavy rain after fires.

== Management ==
The National Parks and wildlife service is responsible for management of the Blue Mountain Swamp communities, as part of the Office of Environment and Heritage (New South Wales), in conjunction with the Blue Mountains City Council.

== See also ==
- Michael Eades Reserve, which features hanging swamps
