= Tanzania Environmental Conservation Society =

Environmental Organisation

- Jumuiya ya Uhifadhi wa Mazingira Tanzania
- Abbreviation: TECOSO Tanzania
- Founded: 1998 (First activities in 1999)
- Founders: Isdory Tarimo, Irene Tarimo
- Founded at: Kilimanjaro Region
- Type: Non-governmental organisation
- Tax ID no.: 132-123-942 (Issued by TRA)
- Registration no.: Number SA.9735 (Issued by Registrar of Societies in Tanzania)
- Purpose: Environmental protection, Health, Education and Ecotourism
- Headquarters: Arusha; Kilimanjaro Region
- Location: Tanzania
- Region served: East Africa Community
- Method: Research, Field Projects, Consultancy
- Executive Director: Isdory Tarimo
- Affiliations: Tanzania Agriculture Society (TASO), SNV, UNDP, JICA JAPAN, Hivos, DITEC Tanzania, Balton Tanzania, Mount Meru University, Ardhi University
- Website: Tecoso Website
- Formerly called: Tarakea Environmental Conservation Society

The Tanzania Environmental Conservation Society, also known as TECOSO, is a Tanzania non-governmental organization founded in the year 1998 and registered on 11 February 1999, under the Societies Act CAP.337 R.E.2002 from The Societies (Application for Registration) Rules of 1954. Its focus is Environmental protection and Habitat conservation, promoting an integrated approach that includes community development, Environmental education, Nature conservation and Ecotourism. The organisation is also a piece of supportive machinery in collaborating and conducting field research projects, Leadership development, Vocational education that focus on gender parity.

== Conservation approach and partnership ==
TECOSO Tanzania also maintains an inter-continental network for information exchange and capacity building of conservation efforts. It works with different partners, including government institutions or associations, researchers, local and international learning institutions, universities and other NGOs. Most of the organisation activities are undertaken in Arusha Region, Manyara Region, Dar es Salaam, and Kilimanjaro Region.

== Membership ==
In 2021, TECOSO with other country organizations and foreign colleges, universities, global initiatives, government ministries worldwide, became a member of GWCN (Global Waste Cleaning Network).

In 2022, TECOSO became a member of GCP (Global Climate Pledge), which advocates on training farmers to conserve and manage land to protect watersheds and improve soil fertility while promoting sustainable agronomic practices.

== See also ==
- Lake Chala
- Mount Kilimanjaro
- List of Tanzanian conservation organisations
