= Sanjog (given name) =

Sanjog is a given name. Notable people with the name include:

- Sanjog Chhetri (1982–2003), Indian paratrooper
- Sanjog Adhikari (1950 - Present), Nepali Politician
