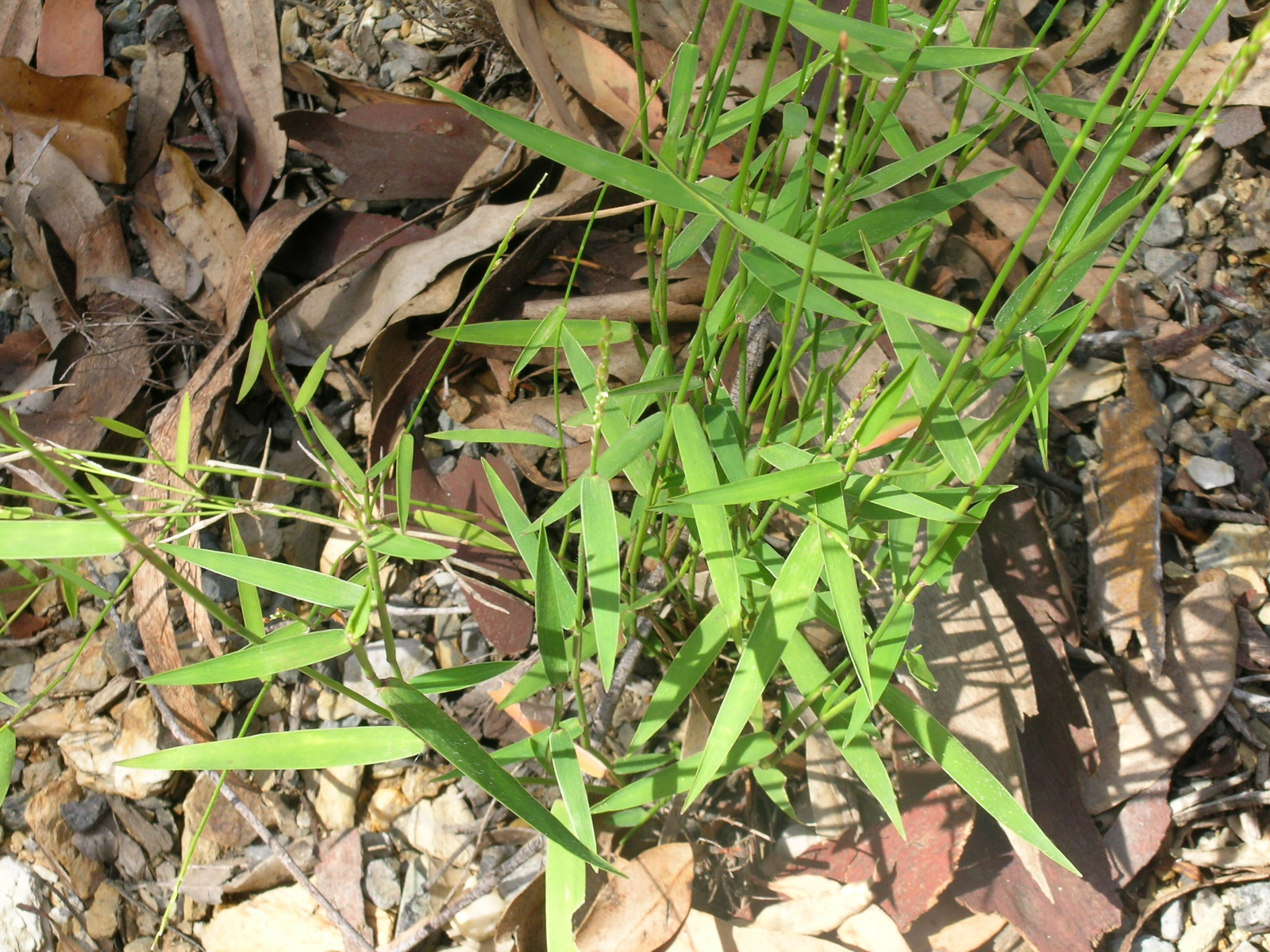

Scientific classification
- Kingdom: Plantae
- Clade: Tracheophytes
- Clade: Angiosperms
- Clade: Monocots
- Clade: Commelinids
- Order: Poales
- Family: Poaceae
- Subfamily: Panicoideae
- Genus: Entolasia
- Species: E. stricta

Binomial name
- Entolasia stricta (R.Br.) D.K.Hughes

Synonyms
- Panicum strictum

= Entolasia stricta =

Species of grass

Entolasia stricta, commonly known as wiry panic, is a species of right angled grass in the family Poaceae. It is found in eastern Australia on sandy or sandstone-based soils. The leaves are inrolled or curved inwards and somewhat rough to the touch. It first appeared in scientific literature in 1810 as Panicum strictum in the Prodromus Florae Novae Hollandiae, authored by the prolific Scottish botanist Robert Brown. It was given its current name in 1923.
