= MarAlliance =

Belize-based nonprofit organization

- Allied for Marine Wildlife
- Type: Environmental organization
- Headquarters: Charter House, Suite 6 Philip Goldson Highway; Belize City, Belize
- Region served: Belize, Guatamala, Honduras, Mexico, & Panama
- Founder & Exec. Director: Dr. Rachel Graham
- Website: maralliance.org

MarAlliance is an international nonprofit organization focused on the conservation of threatened marine wildlife and their habitats. Founded in 2014 and based in Belize, the organization conducts marine research, engages with local communities, and supports policy efforts to protect species such as sharks, rays, sea turtles, and other large marine fauna. It is legally registered in the United States as a 501(c)(3) nonprofit and also maintains nonprofit status in Belize, Cabo Verde, and Panama. MarAlliance has a strong regional presence in Central America and the Caribbean.

== Mission and activities ==
MarAlliance seeks to explore, enable, and inspire conservation action for large marine wildlife and their habitats through collaboration with fishers, NGOs, government agencies, and other stakeholders. The organization identifies and implements science-based management tools by building local scientific capacity and conducting long-term ecological monitoring. Its activities include whale shark research in multiple countries, spawning aggregation studies in Belize and Micronesia, and fisheries-dependent and independent research on sharks and rays. MarAlliance also evaluates the effectiveness of marine protected areas (MPAs) for large fish species.

MarAlliance considers marine protected areas (MPAs) one of the most important tools in their conservation work. The organization identifies and recommends sites for protection and collaborates with fishers and MPA managers in 13 areas across five countries to strengthen protective measures for migratory species. Surveys and studies conducted by MarAlliance have contributed to understanding marine resource use, including the status of sawfish, economic impacts of wildlife tourism, and trends in finfish preferences and fisheries. These findings have helped shape outreach campaigns and support legislative reform.

MarAlliance has established regional networks to scale its conservation impact. In 2013, it launched a monitoring network for marine megafauna in Mesoamerican Reef countries (Mexico, Belize, Guatemala, and Honduras), now including 24 partners. In 2015, the Caribbean Chondrichthyan Network was founded to address the decline in sharks and rays with 39 partners across the region.

The organization provides training programs for students, fishers, and conservation partners in scientific research, data analysis, and communication. These initiatives include peer-to-peer training and the Z-Scholarship program, which supports mentoring, skill-building, and job placements for young marine conservationists.

Community outreach is a core component of MarAlliance’s work. Their Children of the Sea (Niños del MAR) program introduces students to marine science and fosters stewardship through school events and social media engagement. Successful local projects are scaled through partnerships and adapted to other regions with similar conservation needs.

== Fieldwork and impact ==
MarAlliance has contributed significantly to marine conservation in the Mesoamerican Reef, the second-largest barrier reef system in the world. Monitoring is carried out with the participation of over 60 local fishers, who are trained in data collection, fish tagging, and species release. This partnership provides sustainable livelihoods while promoting stewardship of marine resources.

At Lighthouse Reef Atoll, MarAlliance has been conducting long-term monitoring since 2007. These efforts, together with policy reforms and community partnerships, have led to a notable recovery in Caribbean reef shark populations. In 2021, the National Shark Working Group established no-take zones within 2 nautical miles of Belize’s three atolls—Lighthouse, Glover’s, and Turneffe—based on MarAlliance’s data. Fishers played a crucial role in the enforcement and acceptance of these protections, contributing directly to scientific research and reporting violations.

MarAlliance’s participatory approach was especially impactful during the COVID-19 pandemic. With travel restrictions in place, trained local fishers continued monitoring independently, a model that reinforced long-term community-based conservation.

== Leadership and recognition ==
MarAlliance was founded by Dr. Rachel T. Graham, a marine biologist recognized for her leadership in shark conservation. In 2011, she received the Whitley Gold Award from the Whitley Fund for Nature, presented by Princess Anne in London. The award honored her work in creating Belize’s national shark action plan and promoting youth engagement in marine conservation.

In 2025, Rachel Graham was quoted by National Geographic as an expert on bull shark behavior in a feature on transoceanic shark migration. In the article she emphasized the role of small-scale fishers in advancing marine science.

The organization was also recognized by the United Nations Development Programme’s Equator Initiative, which highlighted its research-led conservation, community training programs, and resilience during environmental crises. MarAlliance was a founding member of the Coalition for Sustainable Fisheries in Belize, which successfully advocated for a national gillnet ban in 2020. It continues to work with national authorities to guide shark tourism strategies and sustainable fisheries policies.
