= Rainforest Partnership =

US-based non-profit organization

- Abbreviation: RP
- Formation: 2007; 19 years ago
- Founder: Niyanta Spelman
- Type: Nonprofit
- Tax ID no.: 26-1618125
- Legal status: 501(c)(3)
- Purpose: Environmental Protection Sustainable Development
- Headquarters: Austin, Texas
- Board Chair: Frank Richards
- Founder and CEO: Niyanta Spelman
- Board of directors: Niyanta Spelman; Frank Richards; Hazel Barbour; Jason Butcher; Lucia Gallardo
- Website: rainforestpartnership.org; worldrainforestday.org; filmsfortheforest.org

Rainforest Partnership is an environmental organization based in Austin, Texas, that works to help rainforest communities in Ecuador and Peru become economically self-sufficient, while educating communities in the United States about the role rainforests play in climate protection. It serves to link communities located in and around Latin American rainforests with partner communities in the US.

== History ==
Rainforest Partnership was founded in 2007 by Niyanta Spelman, Hazel Barbour, Jordan Erdos, and Bob Warneke, facilitated by Beth Caplan. In 2008, Rainforest Partnership established its first major partnership with the community of Chipaota in Peru.

== Projects and activities ==
=== Projects ===
Projects aim to create and support sustainable economic alternatives to deforestation and give local communities a stake in preserving their forests. The mission of a project depends on the nature of the forest and the local community, this includes creating a market in the United States for shade grown crops such as acai berries, cacao, or coffee, medicinal plants, palm trees or for crafts made by local artisans. Rainforest Partnership's first project, in Chipaota, Peru, involved creating a sustainable management plan for harvesting piassaba palms from which to make brooms.

In some communities, such as Pampa Hermosa, Peru, it is more appropriate to develop plans for sustainable logging and for ecotourism. In protecting cloud forests, as the project in Pampa Hermosa aims to do by introducing alternatives to deforestation, local communities are faced with a "win-win" situation according to Ken Young of UT Austin's Geography department. Animals and wildlife are protected while the needs of local people go unharmed. Through a bottom up approach, Rainforest Partnership matches economic development choices to the needs and desires, culture, knowledge, and skills of local communities, and to the opportunities presented by each individual rainforest. The organization functions on a "collective model" in which "much depends on the active consent and ideas of the Latin American partners" describes Michael Barnes of the Austin American-Statesman.

=== Films for the Forest ===
Since May 13, 2010, Rainforest Partnership has held the short film competition Films for the Forest (a.k.a. F3) in which films between 30 seconds to 3 minutes long are submitted centered around a featured theme. Since 2012, F3 has been featured at SXSW Film Festival Community Screenings. The films held in the competition are sent from around the world, including "countries as far away as Brazil, Italy and India". American filmmaker Richard Linklater has served as the primary judge for the competition every year since 2010 alongside guest judges.

Guest judges have included:

- Elizabeth Avellan (2011, 2012), film producer
- Sarah Backhouse (2014)
- Ed Begley Jr. (2011), actor and environmental activist
- Michael Cain (2017), president of EARTHxFilm
- Philippe Cousteau Jr. (2012, 2013), oceanographer
- Eloise DeJoria (2015)
- Jay Duplass (2013), filmmaker and actor
- Taylor Ellison (2015)
- Dilly Gent (2014)
- Solly Granastein (2016)
- Kenny Laubbacher (2015)
- Alonso Mayo (2017), film producer
- Lisa McWilliams (2010)
- Julio Quintana (2016)
- Michel Scott (2010)
- Ginger Sledge (2014)
- Evan Smith (2010), journalist, interviewer and professor
- Dana Wheeler-Nicholson (2013), actress and singer

=== World Rainforest Day ===
Rainforest Partnership launched the inaugural World Rainforest Day on June 22, 2017. The holiday was started as a means to bring awareness to the importance of tropical rainforests and encourage action to prevent deforestation.

Partners for World Rainforest Day include:

- Avoided Deforestation Partners
- South by Southwest
- Austin EcoNetwork
- Earthx Film
- Bonobo Conservation Initiative
- 2020 or Bust
- Earth Day ATX
- Ear to the Earth

== Media ==
Rainforest Partnership has been featured in multiple local media outlets including the Austin American-Statesman's online counterpart, Austin360.com, listener-supported public radio station KUT, and local news station News 8 YNN Austin. Further articles have appeared in The Austin Chronicle, an alternative weekly newspaper published on Thursdays in Austin.
