= Conservation in India =

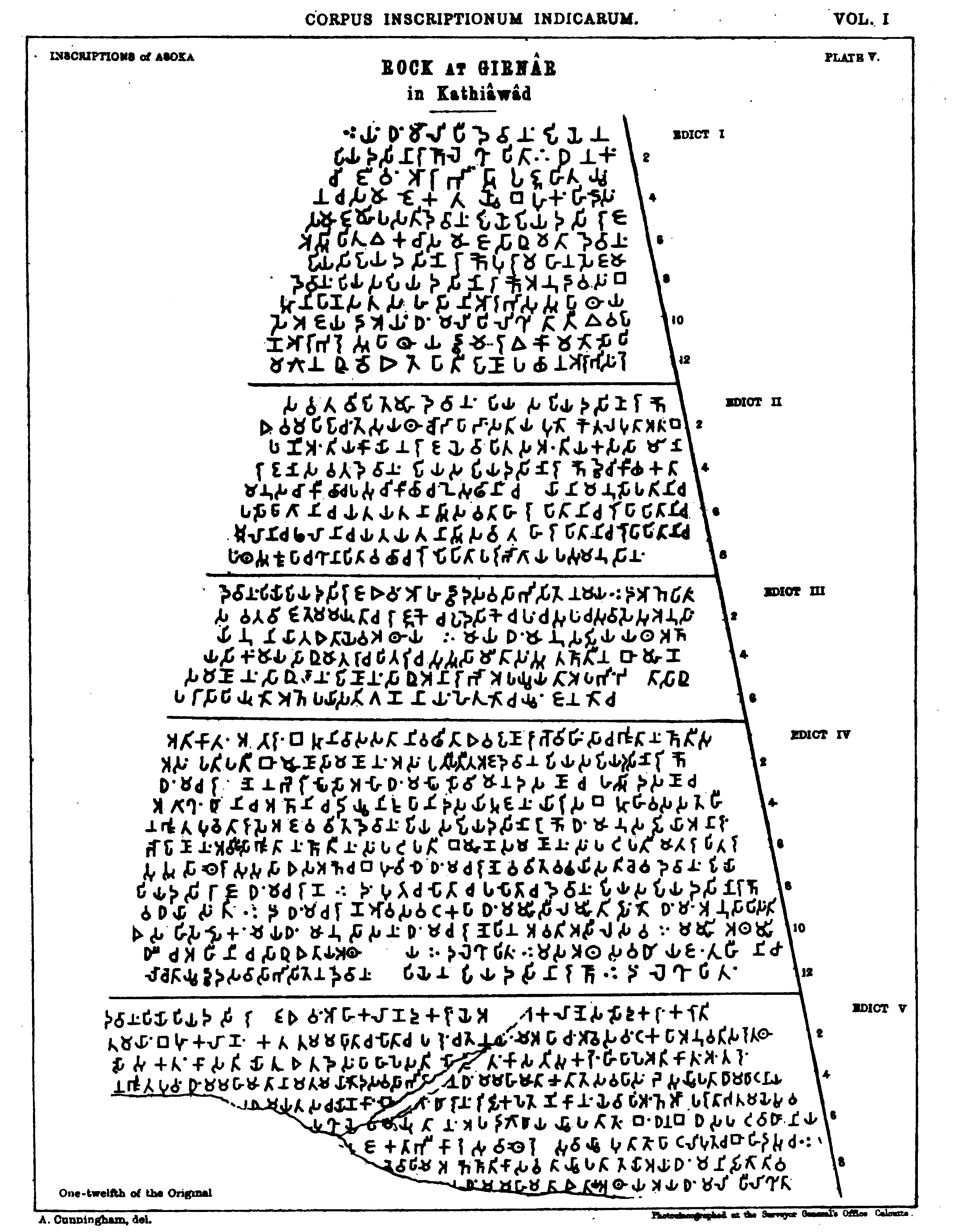
The Ashoka Pillar Edicts were one of the earliest conservation efforts in India.

Conservation in India can be traced to the time of Ashoka, tracing to the Ashoka Pillar Edicts as one of the earliest conservation efforts in the world. Conservation generally refers to the act of carefully and efficiently using natural resources. Conservation efforts begun in India before 5 AD, as efforts are made to have a forest administration. The Ministry of Environment, Forest and Climate Change is the ministry responsible for implementation of environmental and forestry program in India, which include the management of national parks, conservation of flora and fauna of India, and pollution controls.

== History ==
Yajnavalkya Smriti, a historic Indian text on statecraft and jurisprudence, suggested to have been written before the 5th century AD, prohibited the cutting of trees and prescribed punishment for such acts. During Chandragupta's reign, there was a regular forest department led by a Kupyadhyaksha (superintendent) and Vanpalas (forest guards). Kautilya's Arthashastra says that they had a role of classifying the trees, plants and herbs and fixing their price; they imposed fines on those who fell trees without permission. It further mentions how forests were classified into three types: Reserved, those donated to Brahmins and public. Written in Mauryan period, it emphasised the need for forest administration. Ashoka went further, and his Pillar Edicts expressed his view about the welfare of environment and biodiversity.

"Happiness in this world and the next is difficult to obtain without much love for the dhamma, much self-examination, much respect, much fear of evil, and much enthusiasm. [...] Beloved-of-the-Gods, King Piyadasi (Ashoka), speaks thus: Animals were declared to be protected – parrots, mainas, aruna, geese, wild ducks, nandimukhas, gelatas, bats, queen ants, terrapins, boneless fish, vedareyaka, gangapuputaka, sankiya fish, tortoises, porcupines, squirrels, deer, bulls, okapinda, wild asses, wild pigeons, domestic pigeons and all four-footed creatures that are neither useful nor edible. Also protected were nanny goats, ewes and sows which are with young or giving milk to their young, and so are young ones less than six months old. Cocks are not to be caponised, husks hiding living beings are not to be burnt, and forests are not to be burnt either without reason or to kill creatures. One animal is not to be fed to another. Our king killed very few animals."

— Ashoka's Seven Pillar Edicts

== Protected areas ==
As of May 2004, the protected areas of India cover 156,700 km^{2}, roughly 4.95% of the total surface area. These areas are used for in situ conservation, which involves conservation of species in their natural habitat.

== Water Conservation ==
From the most dry regions to the wettest zones in the world, India has them all. Water is not just a natural resource but a political issue in most parts of the country. The Cauvery dispute between Karnataka-Tamil Nadu, Mahanadi dispute between Chhattisgarh-Orissa are a few examples of the tussle for water. The Tamil Nadu government's rainwater harvesting efforts, civil society movements such as Environmentalist Foundation of India (E.F.I's) community based lake/pond conservation efforts are seen as efforts to conserve water in India.

== Endangered species ==
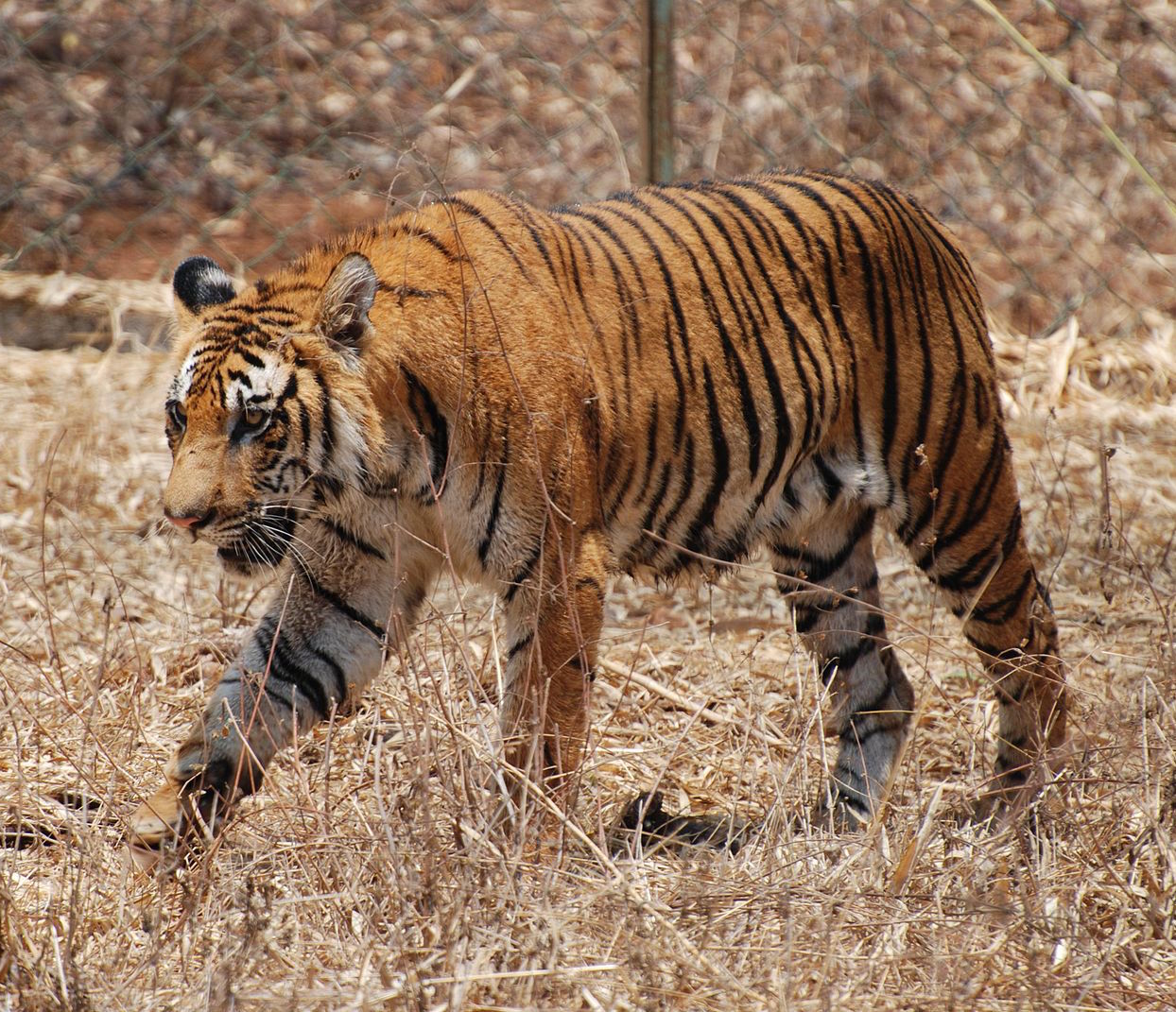
The Bengal tiger, primarily found in India and Bangladesh, is an endangered species.

Some endangered species in the country were reintroduced via ex situ conservation. Ex situ conservation is rearing or cultivating, including reintroducing, a plant or animal outside their natural habitat. The reintroduction of the Indian rhinoceros at the Dudhwa National Park was a form of ex situ conservation; it was extinct in that area. Similarly the Gangetic gharial was reintroduced in Uttar Pradesh, Madhya Pradesh and Rajasthan.

== Legislation ==
- Forest Rights Act
- Indian Forest Act, 1927
- Wildlife Protection Act of 1972

== Forests ==
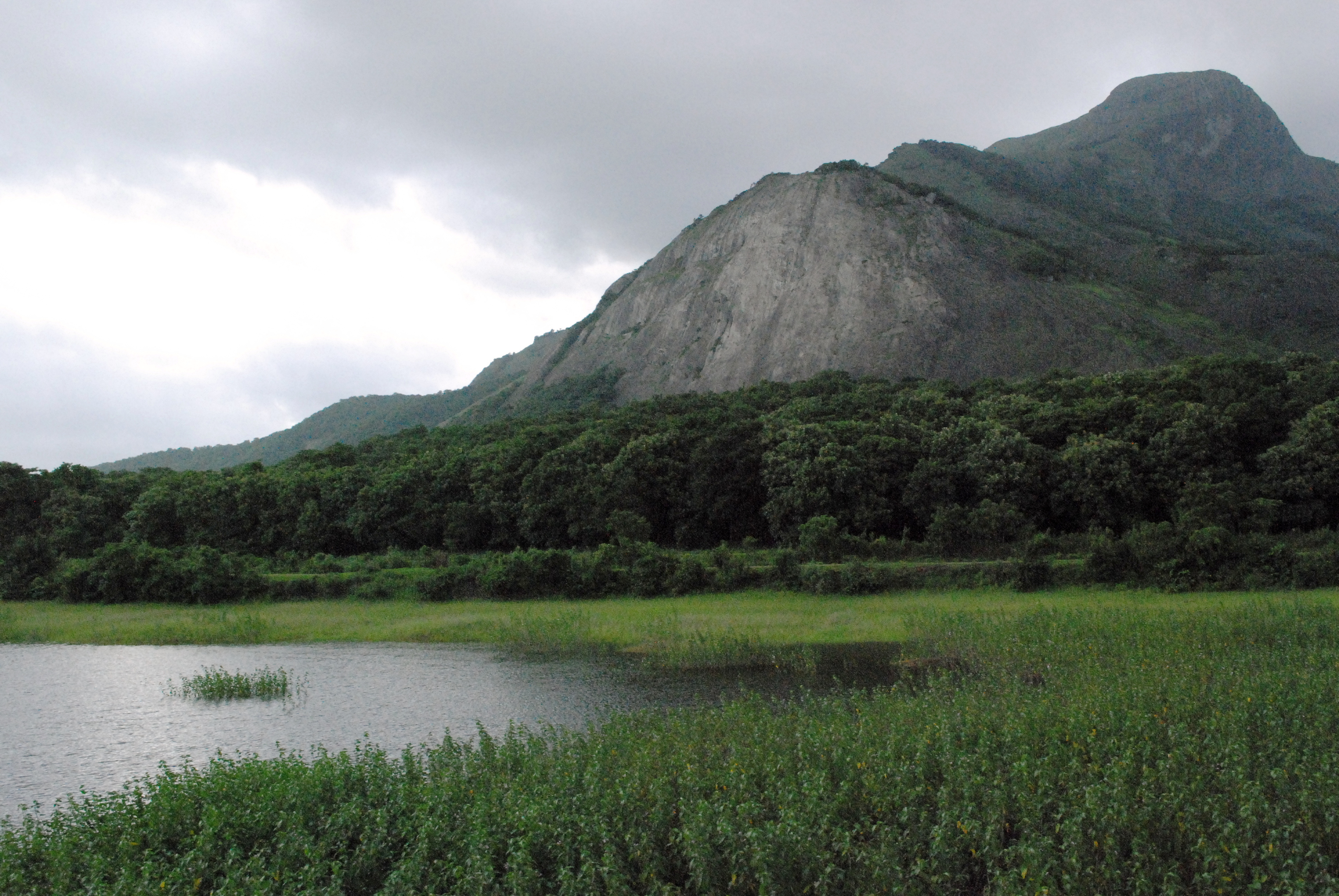
Forests of India's Western Ghats

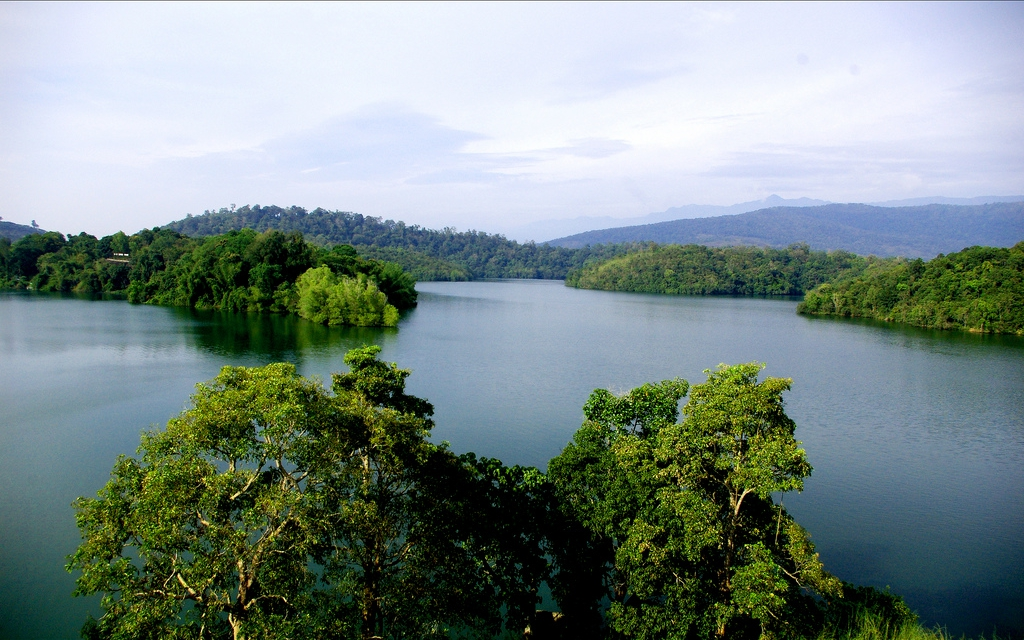
Forests of Kerala. Western part of the Indian peninsula is one of the 32 ecological hotspots of the world.

Ecological issues are an integral and important part of environmental issues challenging India. Poor air quality, water pollution and garbage pollution – all affect the food and environment quality necessary for ecosystems.

India is a large and diverse country. Its land area includes regions with some of the world's highest rainfall to very dry deserts, coast line to alpine regions, river deltas to tropical islands. The variety and distribution of forest vegetation is large. India is one of the 12 mega regions of the world.

Indian forests types include tropical evergreens, tropical deciduous, swamps, mangroves, sub-tropical, montane, scrub, sub-alpine and alpine forests. These forests support a variety of ecosystems with diverse flora and fauna.

Until recently, India lacked an objective way to determine the quantity of forests it had, and the quality of forests it had.

Forest cover measurement methods

Prior to the 1980s, India deployed a bureaucratic method to estimate forest coverage. A land was notified as covered under Indian Forest Act, and then officials deemed this land area as recorded forest even if it was devoid of vegetation. By this forest-in-name-only method, the total amount of recorded forest, per official Indian records, was 71.8 million hectares (177×10^{6} acres). Any comparison of forest coverage number of a year before 1987 for India, to current forest coverage in India, is thus meaningless; it is just bureaucratic record keeping, with no relation to reality or meaningful comparison.

In the 1980s, space satellites were deployed for remote sensing of real forest cover. Standards were introduced to classify India's forests into the following categories:

- Forest Cover: defined as all lands, more than one hectare in area, with a tree canopy density of more than 10 percent. (Such lands may or may not be statutorily notified as forest area).
  - Very Dense Forest: All lands, with a forest cover with canopy density of 70 percent and above
  - Moderately Dense Forest: All lands, with a forest cover with canopy density of 40–70 percent
  - Open Forest: All lands, with forest cover with canopy density of ten to forty percent
  - Mangrove Cover: Mangrove forest is salt tolerant forest ecosystem found mainly in tropical and sub-tropical coastal and/or inter-tidal regions. Mangrove cover is the area covered under mangrove vegetation as interpreted digitally from remote sensing data. It is a part of forest cover and also classified into three classes viz. very dense, moderately dense and open.
  - Non Forest Land: defined as lands without any forest cover
- Scrub Cover: All lands, generally in and around forest areas, having bushes and or poor tree growth, chiefly small or stunted trees with canopy density less than 10 percent
- Tree Cover: Land with tree patches (blocks and linear) outside the recorded forest area exclusive of forest cover and less than the minimum mappable area of one hectare
- Trees Outside Forests: Trees growing outside Recorded Forest Areas

The first satellite recorded forest coverage data for India became available in 1987. India and the United States cooperated in 2001, using Landsat MSS with spatial resolution of 80 metres, to get accurate Indian forest distribution data. India thereafter switched to digital image and advanced satellites with 23 metres resolution and software processing of images to get more refined data on forest quantity and forest quality. India now assesses its forest distribution data biennially. The 2007 forest census data thus obtained and published by the Government of India suggests the five states with largest area under forest cover as the following:

- Madhya Pradesh: 7.64 million hectares
- Arunachal Pradesh: 6.8 million hectares
- Chhattisgarh: 5.6 million hectares
- Orissa: 4.83 million hectares
- Maharashtra: 4.68 million hectares

India hosts significant biodiversity; it is home to 7.6% of all mammalian, 12.6% of avian, 6.2% of reptilian, and 6.0% of flowering plant species.

In recent decades, human encroachment has posed a threat to India's wildlife; in response, a system of national parks and protected areas, first established in 1935, was substantially expanded. In 1972, India enacted the Wildlife Protection Act and Project Tiger to safeguard crucial habitat; further federal protections were promulgated in the 1980s. Along with over 500 wildlife sanctuaries, India now hosts 18 biosphere reserves, eleven of which are part of the World Network of Biosphere Reserves; 27 wetlands are registered under the Ramsar Convention.

These laws did not have the effect they intended.

In 1985, India created the Ministry of Environment and Forests. This was followed by a National Forest Policy and the major government reforms of the early 1990s.

Over the last 20 years, India has reversed the deforestation trend. Specialists of the United Nations report India's forest as well as woodland cover has increased. A 2010 study by the Food and Agriculture Organisation ranks India amongst the 10 countries with the largest forest area coverage in the world (the other nine being Russian Federation, Brazil, Canada, United States of America, China, Democratic Republic of the Congo, Australia, Indonesia and Sudan). India is also one of the top 10 countries with the largest primary forest coverage in the world, according to this study.

From 1990 to 2000, FAO finds India was the fifth largest gainer in forest coverage in the world; whilst from 2000 to 2010, FAO considers India as the third largest gainer in forest coverage.

National Forest Commission and India's afforestation programme

In 2003, India set up a National Forest Commission to review and assess India's policy and law, its effect on India's forests, its impact of local forest communities, and to make recommendations to achieve sustainable forest and ecological security in India. The report made over 300 recommendations including the following:

- India must pursue rural development and animal husbandry policies to address local communities need to find affordable cattle fodder and grazing. To avoid destruction of local forest cover, fodder must reach these communities on reliable roads and other infrastructure, in all seasons year round.
- The Forest Rights Bill is likely to be harmful to forest conservation and ecological security. The Forest Rights Bill became a law since 2007.
- The government should work closely with mining companies. Revenue generated from lease of mines must be pooled into a dedicated fund to conserve and improve the quality of forests in the region where the mines are located.
- Power to declare ecologically sensitive areas must be with each Indian state.
- The mandate of State Forest Corporations and government owned monopolies must be changed.
- Government should reform regulations and laws that ban felling of trees and transit of wood within India. Sustainable agro-forestry and farm forestry must be encouraged through financial and regulatory reforms, particularly on privately owned lands.

India's national forest policy expects to invest US$26.7 billion by 2020, to pursue nationwide afforestation coupled with forest conservation, with the goal of increasing India's forest cover from 20% to 33%.

== Notable organisations ==
- Bombay Natural History Society
- Environmentalist Foundation of India
- National Tiger Conservation Authority
- Nature Conservation Foundation
- Pragya
- WWF-India
- Wildlife Protection Society of India
- Wildlife Trust of India

== Notable conservationists ==
- Dr. K.K. Mohammed Koya Sea Cucumber Conservation Reserve
- Kenneth Anderson
- Chandi Prasad Bhatt
- Billy Arjan Singh
- Salim Ali
- Romulus Whitaker
- Arun Krishnamurthy
- A. J. T. John Singh
- Ashok Kumar (Founder, WTI)
- H. S. Panwar
- Atmaram Pandurang
- Sakharam Arjun
- Saad Bin Jung
- Meena Venkataraghavan
- Saroj R. Choudhury
- T. F. Bourdillon
- Jim Corbett
- K. Ullas Karanth
- Mysore Doreswamy Madhusudan
- Parbati Barua
- Snake Shyam
- Valmik Thapar
- Belinda Wright

== See also ==
- Appiko movement
- Chipko movement
- Conservation reserves and community reserves of India
- Sálim Ali Centre for Ornithology and Natural History
- Ralegan Siddhi
- Arid Forest Research Institute (AFRI)
