= Environment of India =

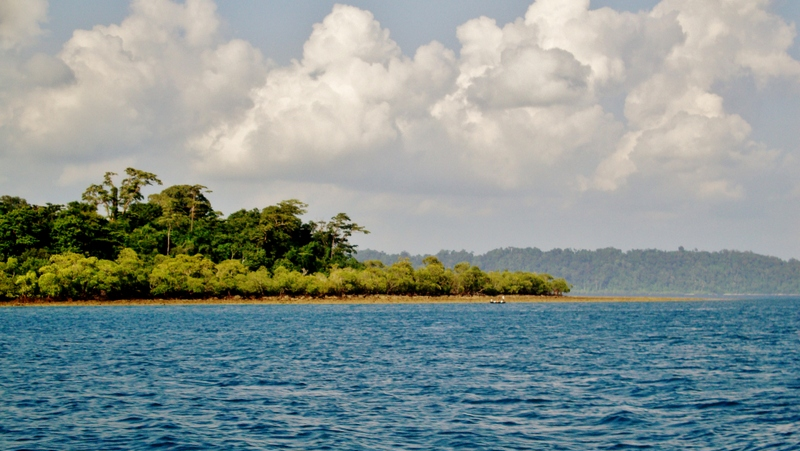
Andaman and Nicobar Islands in the Indian Ocean

The environment of India comprises some of the world's most biodiverse ecozones. The Deccan Traps, Gangetic Plains and the Himalayas are the major geographical features. The country faces different forms of pollution as its major environmental issue and is more vulnerable to the effects of climate change being a developing nation. India has laws protecting the environment and is one of the countries that signed the Convention on Biological Diversity (CBD) treaty. The Ministry of Environment, Forest and Climate Change and each particular state forest departments plan and implement environmental policies throughout the country.

In 2026, India ranked 176 position in Environment Performance Index out of the 177 countries.

== Features ==
=== Biota ===
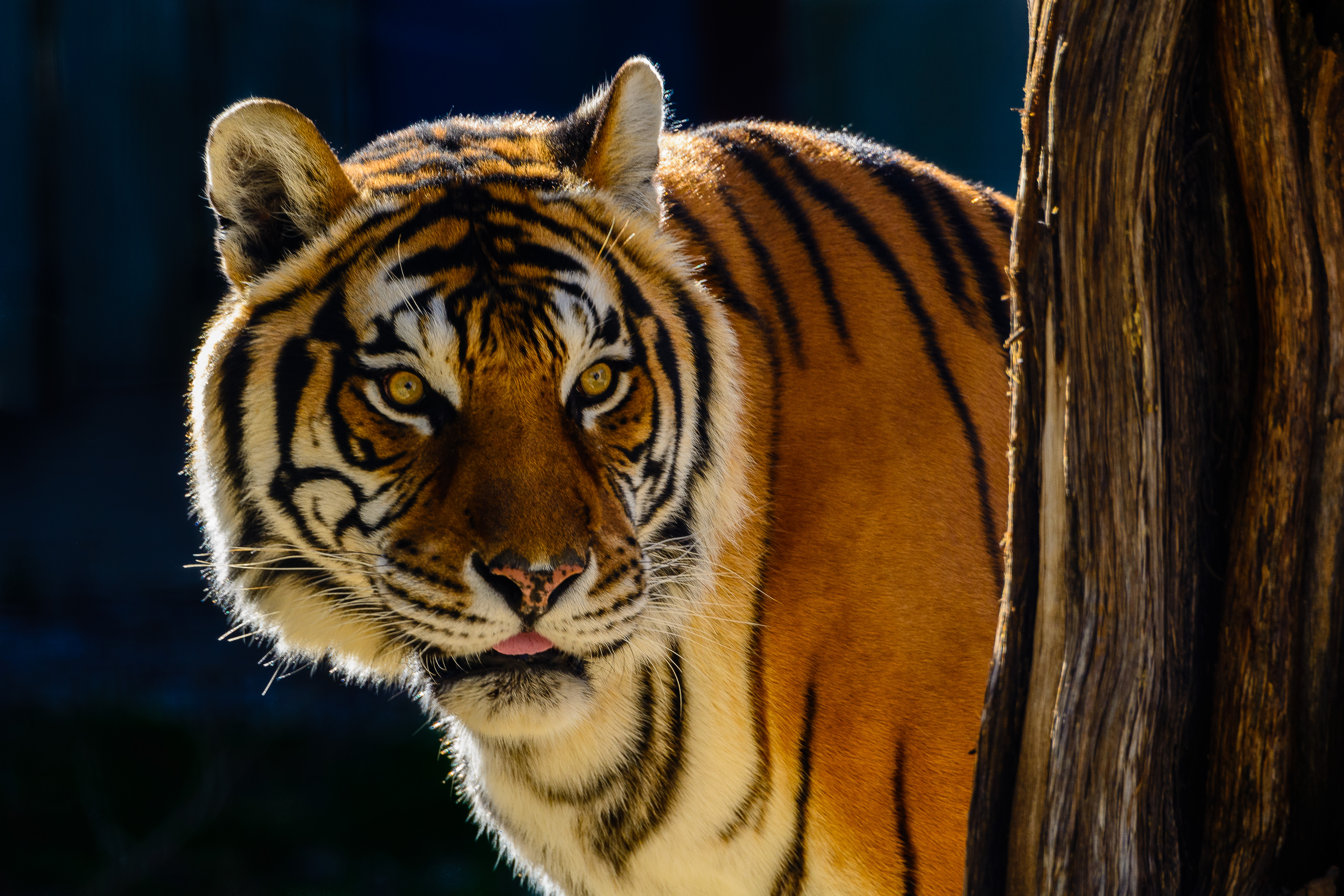
The Bengal tiger. India has the highest number of cat species in the world.

India has some of the world's most biodiverse ecozones—desert, high mountains, highlands, tropical and temperate forests, swamplands, plains, grasslands, areas surrounding rivers and an island archipelago. It hosts three biodiversity hotspots: the Western Ghats, the Himalayas and the Indo-Burma region. These hotspots have numerous endemic species.

In 2021, around 7,13,789 km^{2} of land in the country was under forests and 92 percent of that belonged to the government. Only 22.7 percent was forested compared to the recommended 33 percent by the National Forest Policy Resolution (1952). Majority of it are broad-leaved deciduous trees which comprise one-sixth sal and one-tenth teak. Coniferous types are found in the northern high altitude regions and comprise pines, junipers and deodars.

There are 350 species of mammals, 375 reptiles, 130 amphibians, 20,000 insects, 19000 fish and 1200 species of birds in India. The Asiatic lion, Bengal tiger and leopard are the main predators; the country has the most species of cats than any other. Elephants, the Indian Rhinoceros and eight species of deer are also found.

There are over 17000 species of flowering plants in India, which account for six percent of the total plant species in the world. India comprises seven percent of world's flora. Wide range of climatic conditions in India gave rise to rich variety of flora. India covers more than 45,000 species of flora, out of which several are endemic to the region. India is divided into eight main floristic regions: North-Western Himalayas, Eastern Himalayas, Assam, Indus plain, Ganga plain, the Deccan, the Malabar and the Andamans.

=== Geography ===
India lies on the Indian Plate, the northern portion of the Indo-Australian Plate, whose continental crust forms the Indian subcontinent. The country is situated north of the equator between 8°4' and 37°6' north latitude and 68°7' and 97°25' east longitude. It is the seventh-largest country in the world, with a total area of 3,287,263 square kilometres (1,269,219 mi^{2}). India measures 3,214 km (1,997 mi) from north to south and 2,933 km (1,822 mi) from east to west. It has a land frontier of 15,200 km (9,445 mi) and a coastline of 7,517 km (4,671 mi).

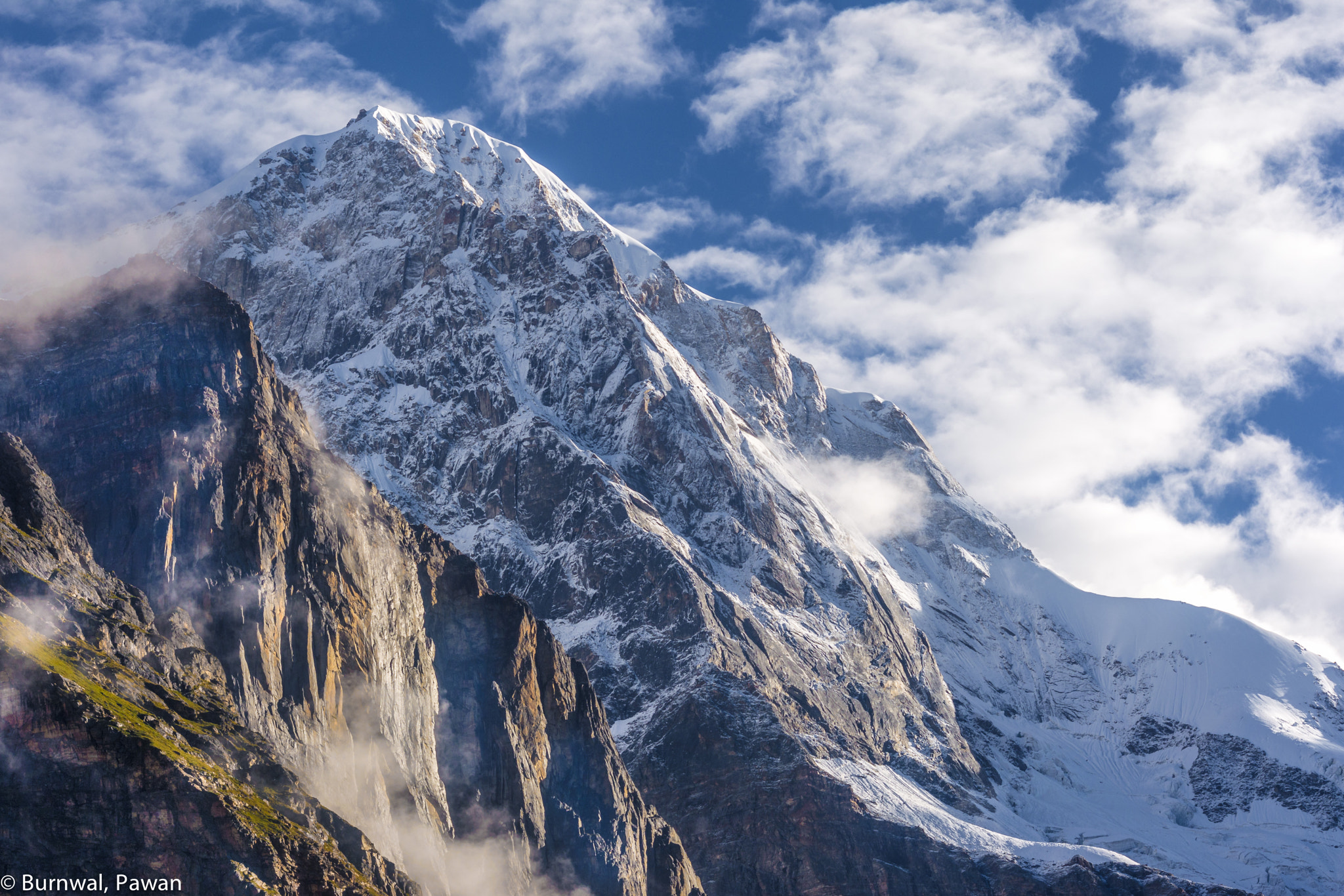
The formation of the Himalayas (pictured) during the Early Eocene some 52 mya was a key factor in determining India's modern-day climate; global climate and ocean chemistry may have been impacted too.

The Indian plate and Eurasia collided between 40 and 60 million years ago according to four observations, one being that there is no mammalian fossil record in India from around 50 million years ago. On its way, the Indian plate passed over the Reunion hotspot which led to volcanic activity, thus forming the Deccan Traps. Its collision with the Eurasian plate led to the rise of the Himalayas and the continuous tectonic activity still makes it an earthquake prone area. The Gangetic plains were formed by the deposition of silt by the Ganga and its tributaries into the area between the Himalayas and the Vindhya range. The rock formations can be divided into the Archaean, Proterozoic (Dharwar system), Cuddupah system, Vindhyan system, Gondwana system, The Deccan Traps, Tertiary system, Pleistocene period and recent formations.

The climate comprises a wide range of weather conditions across a vast geographic scale and varied topography, making generalisations difficult. Given the size of India with the Himalayas, Arabian Sea, Bay of Bengal and the Indian Ocean, there is a great variation in temperature and precipitation distribution in the subcontinent. Based on the Köppen system, where the mean monthly temperature, mean monthly rainfall and mean annual rainfall are considered, India hosts six major climatic subtypes, ranging from arid desert in the west, alpine tundra and glaciers in the north, and humid tropical regions supporting rainforests in the southwest and the island territories. Many regions have starkly different microclimates. The Indian Meteorological Department divides the seasons into four: Winter (mid-December to mid-March), Summer (mid-March to May), Rainy (June to September), and Retreating Monsoon (October to mid-December).

== Issues ==
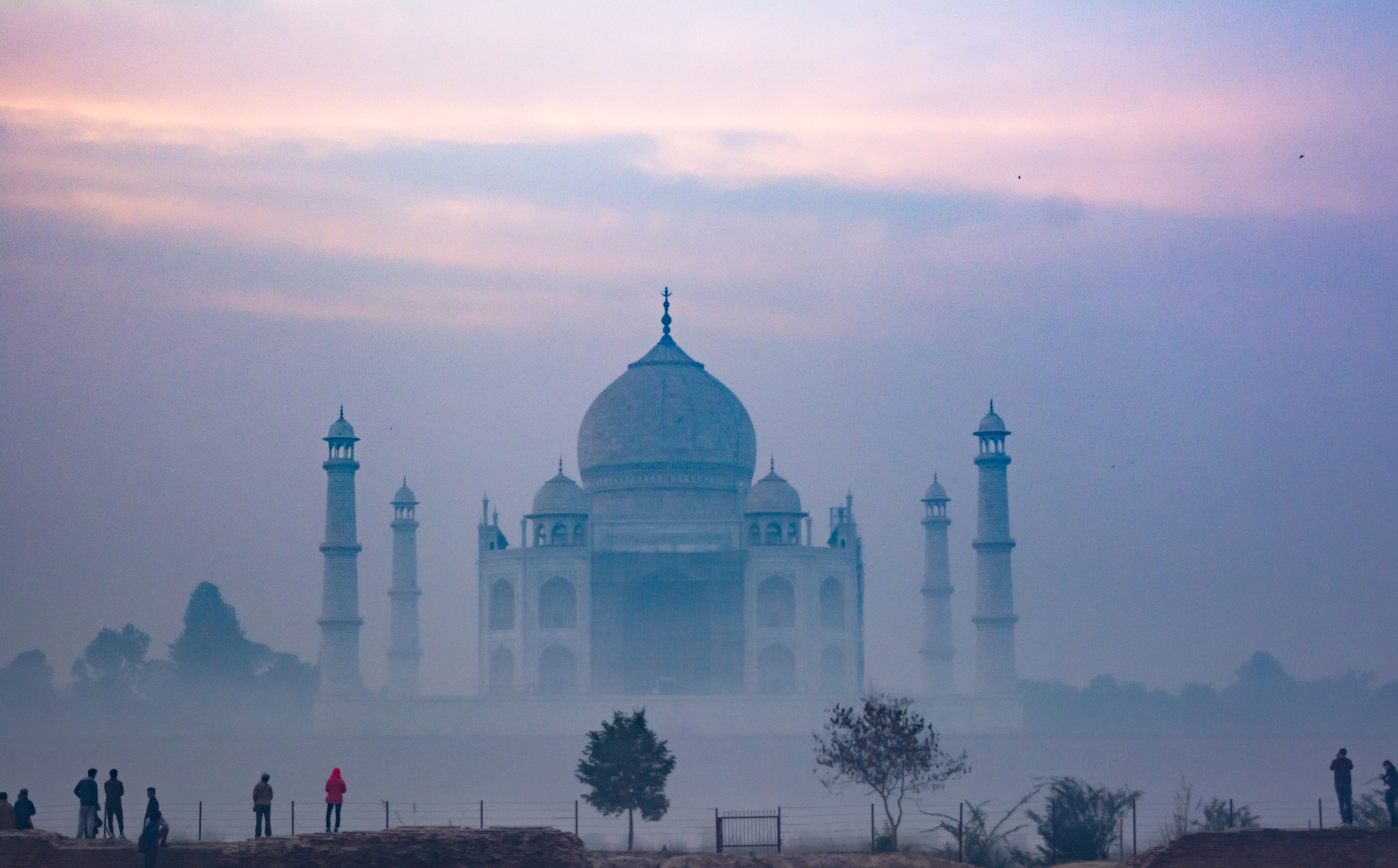
Air pollution in India is a major environmental issue. Shown above is the Taj Mahal blanketed by smog.

Pollution is one of the main environmental issues in India.

- Water pollution is a major concern in the country. The major sources of water pollution are domestic, industrial, agricultural and shipping waste waters. The largest source of water pollution in India is untreated sewage. Other sources of pollution include agricultural runoff and unregulated small scale industry. Most rivers, lakes and surface water are polluted.
- Land pollution: The main causes of soil (or land) pollution is soil erosion, excessive use of chemical fertilisers and pesticides, accumulation of solid and liquid waste, forest fires, and water-logging. It can be reduced by judicious use of chemical fertilisers and pesticides and treatment of effluents before being used for irrigation. Due to increasing population and enhanced food grains consumption, more and more rain fed crop lands are brought under intensive cultivation by ground and surface water irrigation. The irrigated land is losing gradually its fertility by converting into saline alkali soil.
- Air pollution in the country is another concern. A major source is the matter released by the combustion of fossil fuels. Airborne particles like soot, fumes and dust are potentially harmful depending on the pollutant's chemical and physical structure. They can affect climate and reduce scattering of solar radiation in the atmosphere.
- Noise pollution: This can be defined as the state of discomfort or stress caused by unwanted high intensity sound. It increases in proportion to urbanisation and industrialisation.

== Circular Economy and Waste Management ==
India is on the path to adopting a circular economy techniques to face the increasing challenges of waste management in the growing nation. The country produces about 62 million tons of solid waste every year, out of which only 75% is collected and 20% processed. In efforts to handle plastic waste, the government banned single-use plastics in 2022 and set up EPR frameworks for e-waste and packaging material management. Initiatives like the Swachh Bharat Mission gave a sudden increase to waste collection in metropolitan and city areas, but the practice of source segregation of material remains insufficient and there are problems in informal recycling systems.

Promising examples include Indore’s waste segregation and recycling programs, making it India’s cleanest city. Corporates are adopting circular practices by recycling steel scrap, while rural areas engage in community composting. Waste-to-energy plants, though underutilized, offer potential solutions for non-recyclable waste. However, scaling these models requires improved infrastructure, public awareness, and greater investments in technology.

=== Climate change ===
Being a developing nation, India is more vulnerable to the effects of climate change due to its dependence on climate-sensitive sectors like agriculture and forestry. Low per capita incomes and small public budgets also lead to low financial adaptive capacity. The nation is vulnerable to the immediate socio-economic effects of climate change. A 2002 study indicated that the temperature over the country increased at around 0.57° per 100 years.

Inadequate infrastructure also means that people are more exposed, and less resilient, to climate change. For example, as of 2015, only 124 million Indians were connected to a sewer and 297 million to a septic tank. The remainder depend on pit latrines or open defecation, which creates major risks of waterborne disease during floods - which will become more frequent and severe with climate change. These risks are more severe in urban areas, where the higher density of people means that basic infrastructure options might not be adequate. Additionally, many Indian megacities are in floodplains and deltas, and will therefore be very exposed to climate hazards such as sea level rise, storm surges and cyclones.

Although India still has low average incomes per person, the country is now the third largest emitter of greenhouse gas emissions after China and the USA. The central government has pledged to reduce the emission intensity of Gross Domestic Product by 20-25%, relative to 2005 levels, by 2020. India has also made major pledges to expand its renewable energy supply, enhance energy efficiency, build mass transit and other measures to reduce its emissions. There is evidence that many of these climate actions could generate substantial benefits in addition to reducing India's carbon footprint. Many low-carbon measures are economically attractive, including more efficient air conditioners, parking demand management, gasification and vehicle performance standards. Others offer social benefits: for example, Indian cities might see substantial improvements in air quality if the country were to promote renewable energy technologies instead of fossil fuels and walking/cycling/public transport instead of private vehicles.

== Conservation ==
=== Protected areas ===
In July 2023, India has 1,022 protected areas covering 178,640.69 km², approx 5.43% of the country's geographical area. That comprised 100 national parks, 514 sanctuaries, 41 conservation reserves and four community reserves.

=== Policy and law ===
In the Directive Principles of State Policy, Article 48 says "the state shall endeavour to protect and improve the environment and to safeguard the forests and wildlife of the country"; Article 51-A states that "it shall be the duty of every citizen of India to protect and improve the natural environment including forests, lakes, rivers and wildlife and to have compassion for living creatures."

India is one of the parties of the Convention on Biological Diversity (CBD) treaty. Prior to the CBD, India had different laws to govern the environment. The Indian Wildlife Protection Act 1972 protected the biodiversity. In addition to this act, the government passed the Environment (Protection) Act 1986 and Foreign Trade (Development and Regulation) Act 1992 for control of biodiversity.

=== Renewable energy ===
Renewable energy in India comes under the purview of the Ministry of New and Renewable Energy. India was the first country in the world to set up a ministry of non-conventional energy resources, in the early 1980s. Its cumulative grid interactive or grid tied renewable energy capacity (excluding large hydro) has reached 203.18 GW in October 2024, which makes a significant change of 13.5% from the 178.98 GW recorded in October 2023.

India's initiatives such as green energy corridor and PM Surya ghar muft bijlii yojna promote renewable adoption. The government allows 100% FDI in the sector and collaborates internationally (such as partnership with Australia) to boost investments. Regardless of challenges like funding gap and skill shortages, India targets 500GW of renewable energy capacity by 2030.

== Environmentalism ==
In 1973, the government launched Project Tiger, a conservation program aimed at protecting the national animal, the tiger. Its population reached as low as 2000 in 1970. Human population growth, cultivation of forest land and mainly hunting were the key factors for this decline. Aided by the World Wildlife Fund (WWF) and the International Union for Conservation of Nature (IUCN), Indian conservationists were instrumental in getting the government to ban hunting and set aside national parks. Project Tiger further served as a model for protecting endangered species like the Indian elephant and rhinoceros. Around that year, after a protest in a village by the locals against loggers sent by a company, by threatening to hug the trees, similar protests got triggered, collectively known as the Chipko Movement. In the same year, the National Committee for Environmental Protection and Control was formed; in 1980, a department for Environment and finally five years later the Ministry of Environment, Forest and Climate Change was formed. The environmentalist movement in India began with these incidents. Historian Ramachandra Guha calls Medha Patkar as "the most celebrated environmental activist in contemporary India". New age India is concerned about the air and water quality, several civil society groups such as Environmentalist Foundation of India have forged a successful community based conservation model to revive lakes across the country.

== Organisations ==
The Ministry of Environment, Forest and Climate Change through its Department of Environment and the particular state forest departments plan and implement environmental policy in each state. Some national-level environmental organisations (governmental and non-governmental) include:

- Advisory Board on Energy (ABE)
- Bombay Natural History Society (BNHS)
- Central Forestry Commission (CFC)
- Department of Non-Conventional Energy Sources (DNES)
- Environmentalist Foundation of India (E.F.I)
- Industrial Toxicology Research Centre (ITRC)
- National Environmental Engineering Research Institute (NEERI)
- National Dairy Development Board
- National Natural Resources Management System
- National Wetland Management Committee
- State Pollution Control Boards (SPCB)
- Tata Energy Research Institute (TERI)
- Central Soil Salinity Research Institute
- Indian Council of Forestry Research and Education
- List of environmental issues
- National Green Corps
- Water resources in India
- There are at least 85 widely diversified environmental organisations involved with Environmental protection and environmental education in Tamil Nadu.

=== State environmental organisations ===
- Department of Environment (Kerala)
- Department of Forests and Wildlife (Kerala)
- Department of Environment and Forests (Tamil Nadu)
- Department of Environment, Forest, Science and Technology (Andhra Pradesh)
