= Madambakkam Lake =

Reservoir in Tamil Nadu, India

- Location within Chennai
- Location: Madambakkam village, Chennai, Tamil Nadu, India
- Coordinates: 12.910°N 80.165°E
- Type: Reservoir
- Primary inflows: thiruvenchery lake surplus canal and
- Primary outflows: pathuvenchery wier to sithalapakkam lake
- Catchment area: thiruvenchery and madambakkam
- Basin countries: India
- Max. length: 1 km (0.62 mi)
- Max. width: 1 km (0.62 mi)
- Surface area: 250 acres (100 ha)
- Average depth: 1.8 m (6 ft)
- Max. depth: 3.0 m (10 ft)
- Settlements: Chennai

Madambakkam Lake, or Madambakkam Aeri, is a rain-fed reservoir in Madambakkam, Chennai, India, lake serves water for agriculture field nearby and served a drinking water source. The lake covers an area of 250 acres.

== E.F.I's Restoration Effort ==
The Madambakkam lake was one of the first water bodies that the Environmentalist Foundation of India took up for cleaning and restoration. From early 2012 the organization has been volunteering to clean the lake with volunteer support over weekends. The 4-year-long volunteer activity hit a road block and later resumed in 2020 as a full-fledged restoration effort. The restoration efforts included complete deepening, bund strengthening, inlet and outlet regulation, neem islands and cleaning.

== See also ==
- Water management in Chennai
