= National Dairy Research Institute =

ICAR-NDRI, a research institute in Haryana, India

- Type: Public
- Established: 1923; 103 years ago
- Affiliations: ICAR
- Dean: Dr. Ashish Kumar Singh
- Director: Dr. Dheer Singh
- Location: Karnal, Haryana, India, Karnal, 132001, India; 29.704°N 76.982°E
- Campus: Urban, 1,384 acres (560 ha)
- Website: ndri.res.in

National Dairy Research Institute (NDRI) is a public research institute, located in Karnal, Haryana, having been accorded with the status of Deemed University since 1989. NDRI operates under the aegis of Indian Council of Agricultural Research.

== History ==
ICAR-National Dairy Research Institute (NDRI) at Karnal, Haryana is India's premier research institure in the dairy sector. NDRI's lineage goes back to the Imperial Institute for Animal Husbandry & Dairying which was set up in Bangalore in 1923 as a centre for dairy education. In its erstwhile form of Imperial Institute in Bangalore, Mahatma Gandhi and Bharat Ratna Pandit Madan Mohan Malviya, were imparted training at the institute in 1927. They wanted to get acquainted with modern methods of cattle management and spent two weeks discussing and learning technicalities and complexities of problems pertaining to cows and buffalos in India. Gandhiji was highly appreciative of the most productive crossbred cow 'Jill' of the institute. He held several discussions on the problems of Pinjrapoles, which housed low-producing, mostly sterile cows and other dairy stock mainly on humanitarian grounds. Mahatma Gandhi evinced great interest in the work of the institute and wrote several articles in 'Young India' and 'Harijan' on the importance of dairying and scientific cattle management. Gandhiji's thinking and views had a significant influence on the political leadership, particularly towards taking key policy decisions during the early post-Independence era, resulting in the formulation of the Key Village Scheme, Gosamvardhana Council, and intensive Cattle Development Programmes. In 1936 it was renamed as Imperial Dairy Institute and it was shifted to its present site in Karnal in 1955 and renamed again as National Dairy Research Institute. The infrastructure of Imperial Institute was retained as a southern regional station of NDRI and later in 1964 Eastern regional station was set up at Kalyani in West Bengal. In 1970, NDRI was brought under the Indian Council of Agricultural Research. The institute provides education in the field of dairying.

== See also ==
- Central Soil Salinity Research Institute (CSSRI), Karnal
- Sugarcane Breeding Institute (SBI), Karnal
- Indian Agricultural Research Institute (IARI)
- Indian Institute of Wheat and Barley Research (IIWBR), Karnal
- National Bureau of Animal Gentic Resources (NBAGR), Karnal
