= Arun Krishnamurthy =

Indian environmental activist (born 1986)

- Born: 1986 (age 39–40)
- Education: Madras Christian College; Indian Institute of Mass Communication
- Occupation: Environmentalist
- Awards: Jane Goodall Institute Global Youth Leadership (2010); Google Alumni Impact (2011); Rolex Awards for Enterprise (2012)
- Website: www.facebook.com/arunoogle

Arun Krishnamurthy (born 1986) is an Indian environmental activist who has initiated the campaign of cleaning various lakes across India. He is known for founding the Environmentalist Foundation of India (EFI) 2011 based in Chennai which has its branches in 15 states and other cities such as Hyderabad, Delhi and Coimbatore. Arun with the organisation has been successful in cleaning at least 169 lakes in the country and having worked in Google before quitting the job to dedicate voluntarily. He was chosen as among the five people for prestigious Rolex Awards for Enterprise award in 2012 for scientific lake restoration in Chennai.

== Early life and education ==
Arun spent his childhood in Mudichur, a village 29 km from Chennai. He studied in Good Earth School located in Naduveerapattu. He has said that he was inspired by a village panchayat head, Dhamodharan who had encouraged people to collect the garbage from the pond to keep it clean. Arun's friend Karthik Shivasundaram was also his inspiration. He enjoys film-making, photography and cycling. Krishnamurthy completed his bachelor's in microbiology from Madras Christian College and worked at Google, Hyderabad for over three years. Arun then went to study in The Indian Institute of Mass Communication in Delhi. He then joined Goodall's Roots & Shoots in India in 2008, an organisation that helps young people to resolve problems within the communities.

== Time Magazine Next Generation Leader ==
Time magazine named Arun as one of the "Next Generation Leader', a series elevating young people from across fields and around the globe who are working to build a better world. Arun was selected as the Next Generation Leader in 2022.

== TedX Talks ==
As considered having a environment public speaker, Arun is known for his riveting speeches. His TedX talks at Bangalore, NIT Trichy, XLRI-Jamshedpur, VSSUT-Sambalpur, GCT-Coimbatore, IIM-Kashipur and others were well received. His speeches focus on India's rivers, lakes, wildlife.

== Man Ki Baat ==
Arun Krishnamurthy, founder of Chennai-based Environmentalist Foundation of India (EFI), found a mention in Prime Minister Narendra Modi’s Mann Ki Baat on 27 March 2022. In his broadcast, the Prime Minister spoke about conservation efforts across the country, and said Mr. Arun is running a campaign to clean up ponds and lakes. “He took up the responsibility of cleaning over 150 ponds and lakes and successfully completed it,” the Prime Minister said.

== Rolex Laureate ==
Arun Krishnamurthy was chosen to receive the Rolex Award for enterprise. Arun was awarded in the year 2012 at Geneva. He was the youngest to win the award. The award was in recognition of Arun's work towards lake restoration in India.

== Career ==
Arun worked at Google but later quit to start his own company. Arun has stated that environment and wildlife has always attracted him, but the degradation of the urban greenery had motivated him to protect it. Krishnamurthy had founded an internationally recognised organisation, EFI which was founded in 2007, self-funded and was registered as a trust in 2012. The organisation recruits volunteers mainly through school programmes including seminars and workshops. Their main projects include lake restoration, beach clean ups, herbs restoration, stray animal care and eco bags introduction. Arun owns his company Business Krish Info Media, which works in the area of digital media marketing, corporate training, business development and election results predictions.

== Documentary films ==
Arun Krishnamurthy is known for directing several environmental documentary films. This includes a television series titled Neerum Nilamum which was telecasted for eight months on Thanthi TV. The travel documentary on rivers of Tamil Nadu scripted and shot by Arun and team Environmental Film Association was well received. The documentaries were on the Cauvery, Thamirabharani, Vaigai, Adyar, Cooum, Kosasthalayar, Palar and Thenpennaiyaar.

== You V Youtube ==
Arun is one of the 10 quiz masters of the YouTube show You V YouTube. The show hosted by Gaurav Kapur has participants engaging in 10 rounds over 10 different subjects. The Environment segment is being played with Arun over two seasons that airs on YouTube.

== Lake restoration ==
Arun started with cleaning the Gurunadham Lake in Hyderabad and a lake in Delhi and included several other programmes such as 'Green Gramam', which is a development plan for establishing eco-friendly villages, 'AniPal' which is stray animal care programme and 'Waste Not' which offers waste management solutions. They have set up 19 biodiversity parks in schools. Krishnamurthy is involved in a 16-month project which not only provides physical garbage removal but also puts fencing in the lakes to protect them from human activities as in the case of cleaning beach from Injambakkam to Besant Nagar in Chennai. Arun has further told that they have introduced animal ambulance for street animals and on establishing one animal rescue and a rehabilitation centre in Chennai and Hyderabad by 2015.

He as a team follows a scientific approach towards cleaning and saving aquatic species. On wildlife conservation, the team is currently focusing on freshwater life forms, birds that are dependent on the lakes where many turtles live. Arun plans blocking access to any lake once cleaning is completed so that the aquatic plants and species would be protected. Krishnamurthy had won Google Alumni Impact Award in 2011 for restoring lakes in Hyderabad. He had directed documentary films such as ‘Caught By’, which focuses on land and sea connection and fishes in the lakes Kurma (2010), for which he received a British Council International Climate Champion Excellence Award for showing the poor condition of sea turtles and Elixir Poisoned (2011) which highlights the need to protect the aquatic environment. As of May 2017, 39 lakes and 48 ponds have been restored in states such as Kerala, Karnataka, Andhra Pradesh, Telangana and Gujarat.

=== Restoration in Tamil Nadu ===
Arun along with his team EFI is credited in cleaning many lakes in Tamil Nadu with majority of them in Chennai district. Different methods were employed for scientific restoration such as including G-shaped central island for aquatic species, percolation trenches for effective water harvesting, reef bed for growing plankton and installation of decentralised water treatment plant in case of Selvachintamani Kulam lake in Coimbatore. It had also included entire lake division into patches and removal of wastes such as glass, plastic, poultry waste and construction debris from Madambakkam lake, repeated clean up of physical garbage with study of the soil pattern and the quality of water in Keezhkattalai lake along with the awareness and mass sensitisation campaign created among the people. The funding for the restoration had also been done through crowdsourcing with support from the local corporation as well. Similar efforts have been done for cleaning other lakes in 2016 as well.

== Present scenario ==
Arun's organisation EFI had 212 volunteers in Chennai and membership of over 1000 in India by July 2013. Krishnamurthy is credited with cleaning 17 lakes in the country including five in Chennai by May 2013. Arun had mentioned that his NGO plans to clean over 20 lakes by 2016. Arun wants to initiate conservation projects for the corporate and start activities in neighbour countries such as Nepal and Bhutan. He had said that he does not see personal success in winning Rolex award but as a team effort and had stated that people think that without going on the ground the lakes would be free from garbage and dirt, with laying stress on public support through awareness campaigns.

The Arun and EFI has received voluntary support from celebrities of film industry as well, including Kamal Hasan and Trisha Krishnan.

During the 2015 floods in Chennai and areas of Tamil Nadu, Arun and EFI were involved in relief work in Chennai and several villages in Cuddalore District.

== Recognition ==
- British Council International Climate Champion Excellence Award in 2010.
- Google Alumni Impact Award in 2011.
- Rolex Awards for Enterprise award in 2012 for Lake Restoration efforts in Chennai.
- Jane Goodall Institute Global Youth Leadership Award in 2010.
- Youth Action Net Fellow.
- Puthiya Thalaimurai Tamilan Award
- Arun was chosen as one of the 40 under 40 young leaders by The New Indian Express
- Arun was named by CNN as one of the Environmental Heroes to inspire in 2021

Arun Krishnamurthy was chosen as one of the brand ambassadors for the Oxemberg brand in 2018 part of their #MakeYourMove campaign.
