= Belinda Wright (conservationist) =

British conservationist

Belinda Anne Irene Wright OBE (born 1953 in Calcutta, India) is a prominent British wild life photographer and wildlife conservationist based in India. She is the executive director of the Wildlife Protection Society of India (WPSI).

== Career ==
She works actively in Indian wildlife conservation, especially with Indian tigers. She started her career as a photographer.
