= Wildlife Protection Society of India =

Indian wildlife protection organisation

- Formation: 1994
- Type: Not for profit
- Location: New Delhi, India
- Website: www.wpsi-india.org

The Wildlife Protection Society of India (WPSI) was founded in 1994 by Belinda Wright, its Executive Director, who was an award-winning wildlife photographer and filmmaker till she took up the cause of conservation. From its inception, WPSI's main aim has been to bring a new focus to the daunting task of tackling India's growing wildlife crisis. It does this by providing support and information to government authorities to combat poaching and the escalating illegal wildlife trade - particularly in wild tigers. It has now broadened its focus to deal with human-animal conflicts and provide support for research projects.

With a team of committed environmentalists, WPSI is one of the most respected and effective wildlife conservation organisations in India. It is a registered non-profit organisation, funded by a wide range of Indian and international donors. The society's board members include leading conservationists and business people.

== Programs ==
The WPSI works with government law enforcement agencies throughout India to apprehend tiger poachers and traders in tiger parts. WPSI also makes every effort to investigate and verify any seizure of tiger parts and unnatural tiger deaths that are brought to their notice.

=== Investigation ===
WPSI maintains a network of undercover agents and informants who gather intelligence on the illegal trade in endangered species. WPSI's informers and agents are especially active in Uttarakhand, Uttar Pradesh, Maharashtra, Madhya Pradesh, Chhattisgarh, Andhra Pradesh, Kerala, Karnataka, Tamil Nadu, West Bengal and the Sundarbans area.

In November, 2008, in one notable case, the notorious tiger poacher, "Dariya", was arrested by the Katni Forest Department, with information and assistance provided by Wildlife Protection Society of India. Senior field investigators also maintain contact with personnel in lower courts, which is where most wildlife offences are tried. They liaise continuously with informers, forest officials and the police. They are involved with elephant poaching and ivory trade investigations.

=== Crime data ===
The WPSI Wildlife Crime Database has records of over 15,300 wildlife crimes involving more than 400 species that are targeted by wildlife traders and poachers. Data on wildlife crimes is received and processed daily with specially developed computer software. Important leads are verified and passed on to enforcement authorities for further action. In 2008 WPSI significantly expanded its database on tiger poaching and trade and related wildlife crimes. This data assists enforcement agencies in detecting wildlife crime and aids the apprehension and prosecution of criminals.

=== Training ===
WPSI conducts Wildlife Law Enforcement Workshops for enforcement agencies. Since 2000, it has undertaken over 25 workshops in 12 states across India. WPSI has given specialist presentations to the SVP National Police Academy, the National Institute of Criminology, the Central Bureau of Investigation, the Indo-Tibetan Border Police, Indian Revenue Service, the Wildlife Institute of India, tiger reserve authorities, and enforcement training centres.

=== Conservation ===
WPSI supports conservation projects for species as varied as the tiger, otter and sea turtle. Among these projects are: Support to Bandipur Tiger Reserve, Trade & Wildlife Crimes Grassroots NGO Support Network, Support to Corbett Tiger Reserve & Adjoining Forests, Support to Sundarbans Tiger Reserve, WPSI Tiger Protection Awards, Award for Information that Leads to Seizure of Tiger Parts, ‘Operation Kachhapa’, Conservation of the Olive Ridley Turtle, ‘Corridor to Survival’ - Landscape Conservation Plan for Elephant Management, Human-Elephant Conflict & Elephant Mortality in North Bengal, a film campaign on Otter Conservation, Indian Cranes and Wetlands Working Group and Animal- Human Conflict Management. They provide support to the prosecution of wildlife court cases, public interest litigations, wildlife law publications and the Millennium Digest (1950–2003) on Wildlife & Ancillary Laws. They were instrumental in the resettlement of Van Gujjars outside Rajaji National Park. They have conducted research on Interactions between the Ladakh urial & livestock, interactions between snow leopard prey species & livestock, development of pugmark-based population monitoring, human-leopard conflict in Pune District, Maharashtra and effects of forest resource extraction on biodiversity.

=== Education ===
WPSI is actively involved in all of India's major wildlife conservation issues and has been at the forefront of media campaigns to highlight the importance of wildlife protection. WPSI prints and distributes educational posters about tiger and wildlife conservation and laws. The posters target the general population, highlight the need for conservation and encourage the protection of wildlife, and spell out penalties for poaching and trading. More than 40,000 posters have been distributed by state forest departments and local NGOs in seven languages - Hindi, English, Kannada, Oriya, Assamese, Bengali and Malayalam.

=== Publications ===
Some of the WPSI publications include Shatoosh - The Illegal Trade, Skinning the Cat: Crime and Politics of the Big Cat Skin Trade, WPSI-Ranthambhore Tiger Census, May 2005, India's Tiger Poaching Crisis, Tiger Poaching Statistics of India, A God in Distress: Threats of Poaching and the Ivory Trade to the Asian Elephant, Fashioned for Extinction: An Exposé of the Shahtoosh Trade, Handbook of Environment, Forest and Wildlife Protection Laws in India, Wildlife Crime: An Enforcement Guide (English & Hindi), Signed and Sealed: The Fate of the Asian Elephant, The Wildlife Protection Act of 1972 - A Hand Guide With Case Law and Commentaries, A Brief Guide to The Wild Life (Protection) Act (English & Hindi), The Wild Life Protection Act - 1972 - as Amended with effect from 1 April 2003, Warden Alert (Newsletter on wildlife protection issues, English & Hindi editions) and Kachhapa (Newsletter on sea turtle conservation issues, in English).

They have produced documentary films including: Bones of Contention (a short film documenting the crises faced by wild tigers in India as a result of poaching and the illegal trade in tiger parts.), Birds of the Indian Monsoon (a 45-minute film on the lives of Kepladeo Sanctuary's birds), The Killing Fields: Orissa's Appalling Turtle Crisis (a documentary on the mass slaughter of olive ridley sea turtles along the coast of Orissa) and "…And Then There Were None" (a short documentary film which investigates the rampant poaching of otters in India).
