= Central Soil Salinity Research Institute =

Agricultural research center in Haryana, India

- Other name: CSSRI
- Type: Registered Society
- Established: 1969
- Director: Dr. RK Yadav
- Total staff: 301
- Location: Karnal, Haryana, India; 29°42′29″N 76°57′11″E
- Campus: Zarifa Farm
- Website: www.cssri.res.in

The Central Soil Salinity Research Institute (CSSRI) is an autonomous institute of higher learning, established under the umbrella of Indian Council of Agricultural Research (ICAR) by the Ministry of Agriculture, Government of India for advanced research in the field of soil sciences. The institute is located on Kachawa Road in Karnal, in the state of Haryana, 125 km (78 mi) from the Indian capital of New Delhi.

== Profile ==
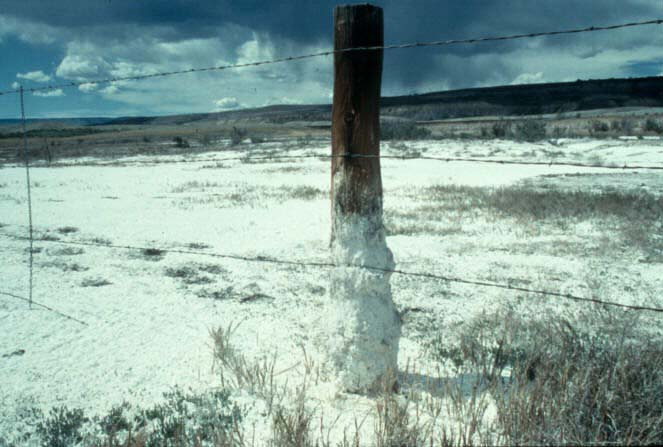
Salt-affected soils

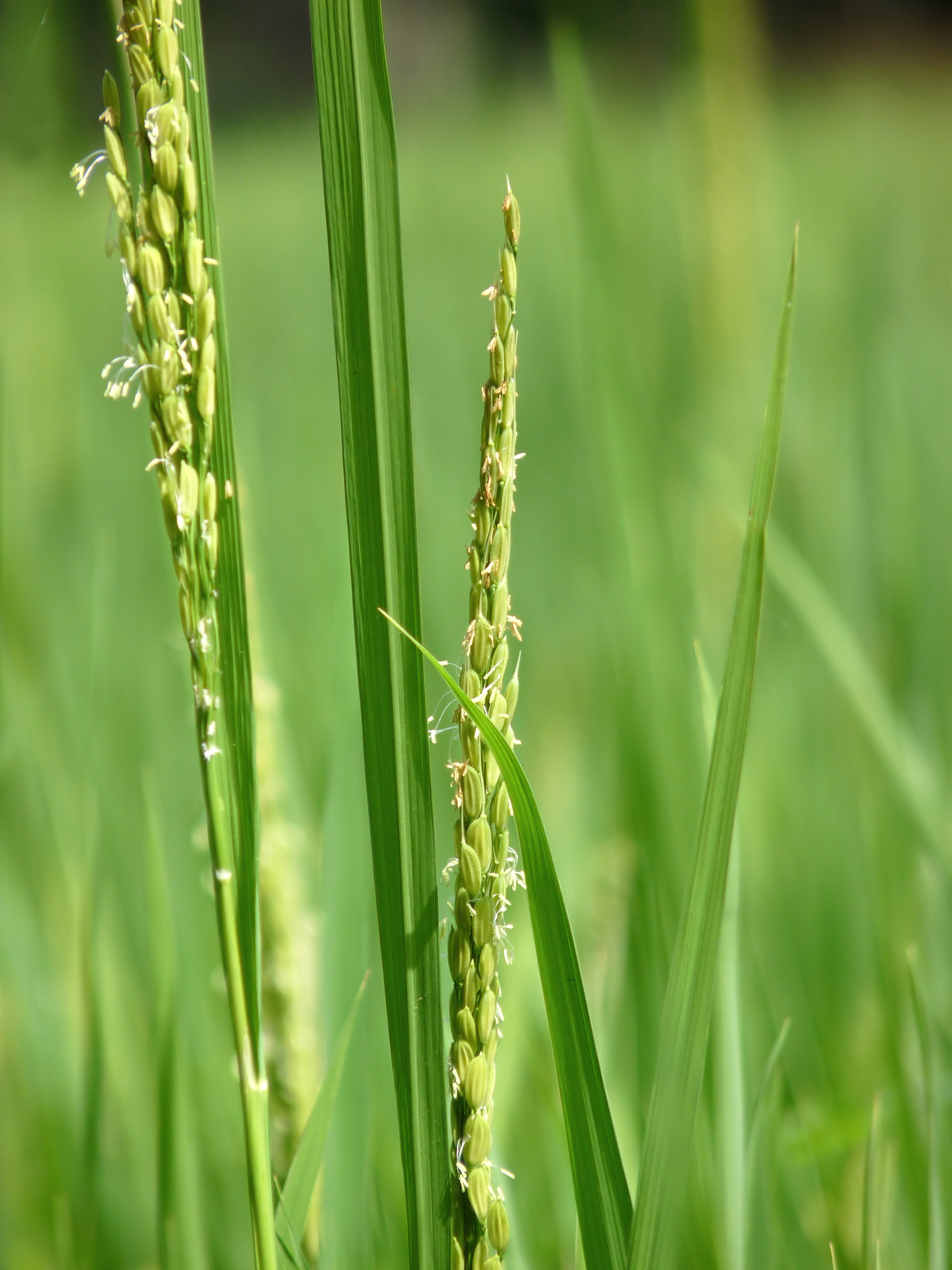
Rice

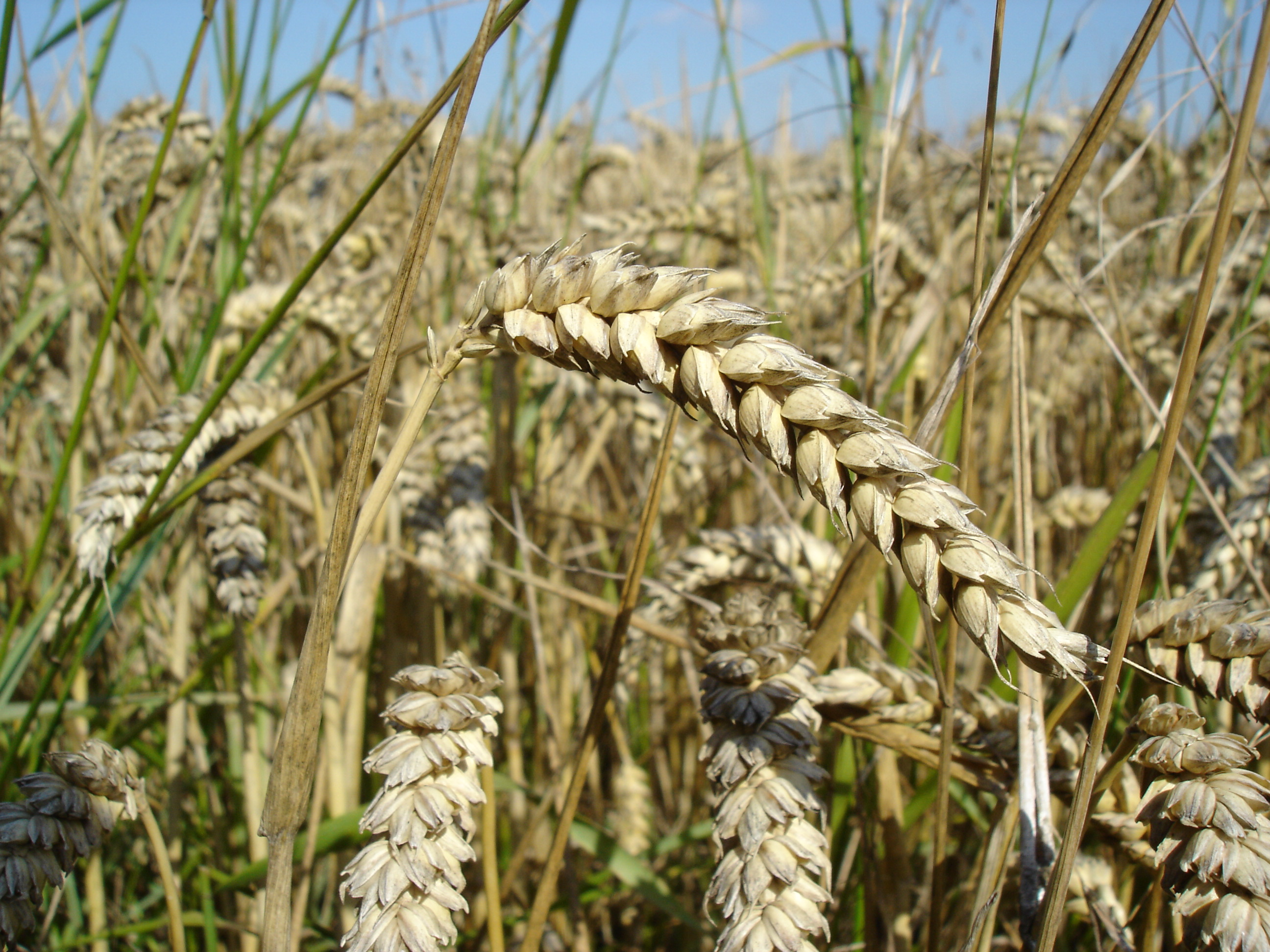

Central Soil Salinity Research Institute (CSSRI) had its origin in Hisar, Haryana, on 1 March 1969, as per recommendations of an Indo-American team, employed to assist the Indian Council of Agricultural Research in developing a comprehensive water management program for India. However, by October 1969, the institute was shifted to its present premises in Karnal and a year later, the Central Rice Research Station, Canning Town, West Bengal was merged with CSSRI.

The institute has a satellite unit in Bharuch, which was originally started in Anand in 1989, but moved to Bharuch in 2003 and hosts the coordinating unit of AICRP on Management of Salt Affected Soils and Use of Saline Water in Agriculture with a network of eight research centres located in different agro ecological regions of the country at Agra, Bapatala, Bikaner, Gangawati, Hisar, Indore, Kanpur and Tiruchirapalli. The coordinating unit of AICRP on Water Management was a part of CSSRI from early seventies till 1990 when it was moved to Rahuri in Maharashtra.

The main achievements of CSSRI may be listed as:

- Reclamation of alkaline soils with the addition of chemical amendments.
- Reclamation of saline soils through subsurface drainage.
- Development and release of salt tolerant crop varieties of rice, wheat and mustard.
- Reclamation of salt affected soils through salt tolerant trees.
- Development of for the salt affected areas of vertisols and coastal regions. The institute has reclaimed nearly 1.5 million hectares (3.7×10^{6} acres) of salt affected land for productive use, producing approximately 15 million tons of food grains annually.
- Development of subsurface drainage technology for waterlogged saline soils. Reclamation has been completed on approximately 50,000 hectares (120,000 acres) of land in Haryana, Rajasthan, Gujarat, Andhra Pradesh, Maharashtra and Karnataka.
- Replenishment of depleting water tables by artificial ground water recharge.

CSSRI manages an International Training Centre under an Indo-Dutch collaboration since 2001. It offers postgraduate-level programs in association with state agricultural universities (SAUs), Indian Institute of Technology (IIT) and other universities.

The institute has undertaken several national and international projects.

- International Rice Research Institute (IRRI) sponsored rice improvement program
- Australian Centre for International Agricultural Research (ACIAR) sponsored Indo-Australian program for wheat improvement
- IRRI, Philippines and CIMMYT, Mexico sponsored program of cereal based systems

== Divisions ==
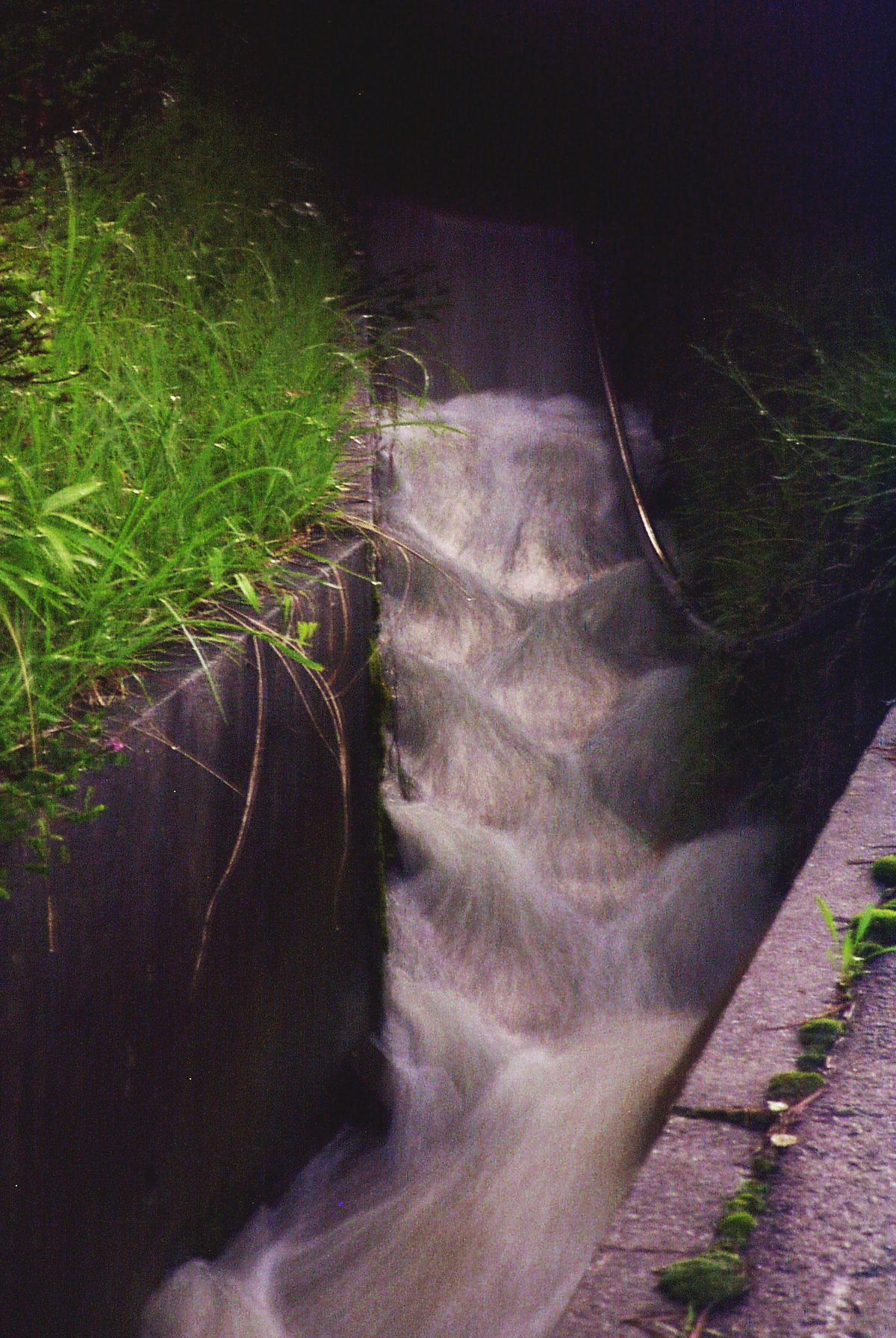
An agricultural drainage channel

Relative groundwater travel times

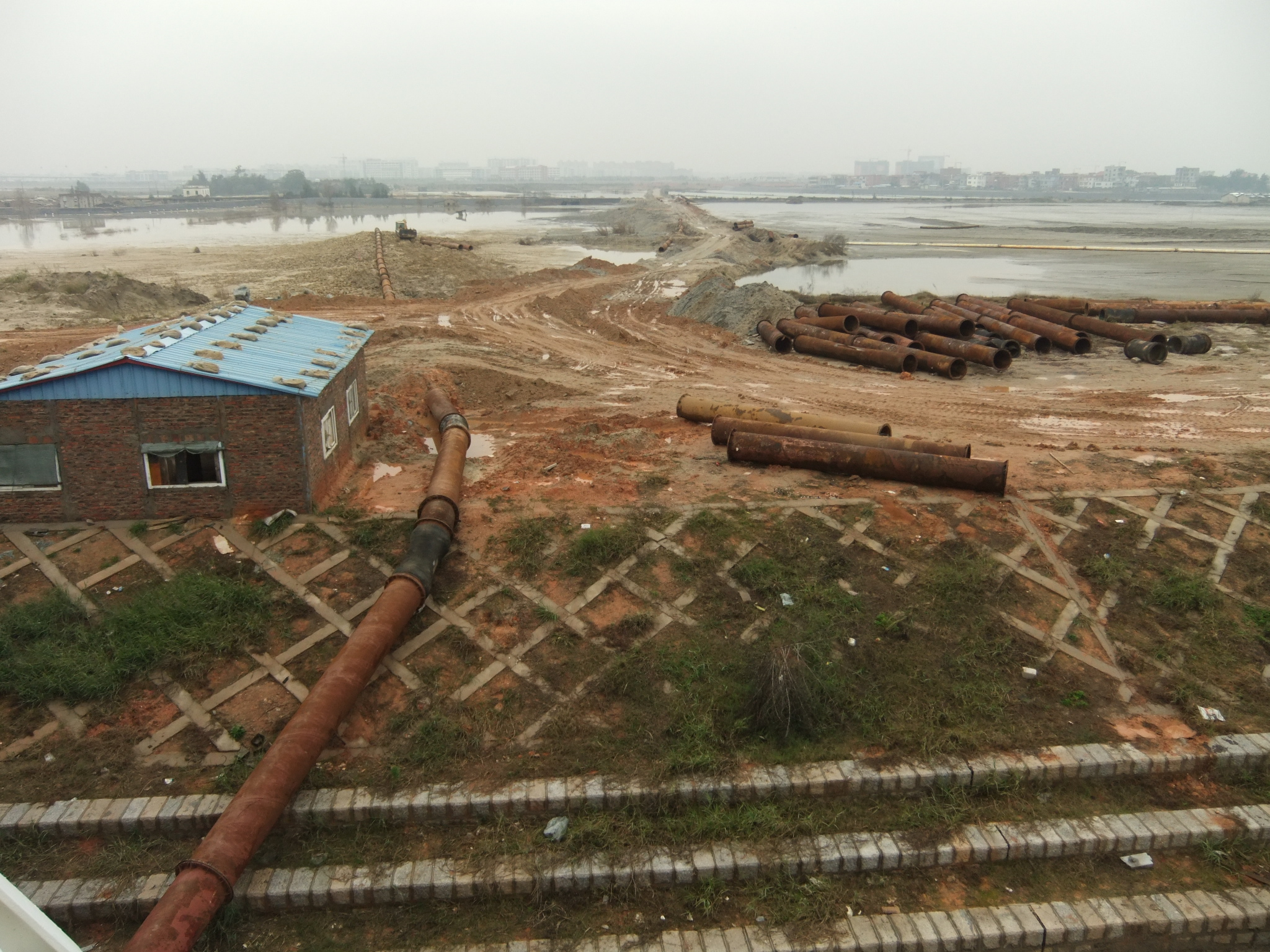
Land reclamation in progress

The institute is engaged in multidisciplinary research activities which are carried out through four divisions.

=== Division of Soil and Crop Management ===
The Division conducts research on resource conservation technologies and cost effective farming system models. It prepares and maintains digital databases of salt affected soils and conducts periodic assessment of soil resources. It also focusses on agroforestry on salt affected soils.

=== Division of Irrigation and Drainage Engineering ===
The Division attends to the areas related to groundwater recharge technologies, subsurface drainage for amelioration of waterlogged saline soils and decision support systems for ground water contaminations. The Division has project partnership with INNO-Asia.

=== Division of Crop Improvement ===
Development of saline and alkaline tolerant crops such as rice, wheat and mustard through conventional breeding and modern molecular and physiological approaches is the primary activity of the Division.

=== The Division of Social Science Research ===
The Division is pursuing to evaluate and assess the socio-economic impact of the technologies developed by the institute. These technologies are transferred to the farmers and other stakeholders through frontline demonstrations, farmers’ fairs, exhibitions, and other extension methods. The development of human resources through trainings on reclamation and management of salt-affected soils and use of poor quality water in agriculture.

== Mandate ==
Mandate: The institute is mandated with:

- Conduct of basic and advanced research on reclamation and management of salt affected soils and development of suitable agrochemical, biological and hydraulic technologies for the use of irrigation water for the development of various agro-ecological zones for sustainable production.
- Generation, assessment and propagation of preventive/ameliorative technology.
- Maintenance and dissemination of information on resource inventories for the management of salt affected soils and waters.
- Act as a fulcrum for researches on salinity management and coordination of research between the various universities, institutions and agencies in the country for developing and testing location–specific technologies.
- Provide advanced training and consultancy in salinity researches in India.
- Liaison with national and international agencies for the achievement of the above objectives.

== Regional Research Stations ==
CSSRI has three regional stations for a wider national coverage, each located at Bharuch, Canning Town and Lucknow.

== Facilities ==
=== Publication and Supporting Service Unit ===
PSS unit is responsible for information dissemination of the scientific researches of the institute and has published 233 research papers on national and international journals, published 25 books and 60 bulletins.

=== Computer Centre ===
The institute is equipped with a modern computer centre since 1988 which acts as the communication hub of the institute. The centre is supported by an ICT infrastructure, LAN network and modern hardware and software. It provides system support in the procurement, maintenance, training, MIS reports, document processing, conduct of computer based exams and IT support for administration. It also maintains the web site of the institute.

=== Health Care Center ===
The institute manages a Health Care Centre with the facility to accommodate 5 inpatients, a senior allopathic medical officer, a part-time ayurvedic medical officer, pharmacist, support staff, clinical laboratory with diagnostic equipment and a pharmacy. A modern fitness centre also operates in the health care centre.

=== Library ===
CSSRI library os a well stocked one, holding a collection of 14,668 books and 7967 bound journals, consisting of publications of FAO, IRRI, UNESCO, ILRI, ICID, IFPRI, ASA and ASAE. The library subscribes to 69 national and 25 international journals other than 15 gratis journals. It also maintains a digital repository with digital magazines such as SOIL, AGRIS and Plant Gene.

=== PME Cell ===
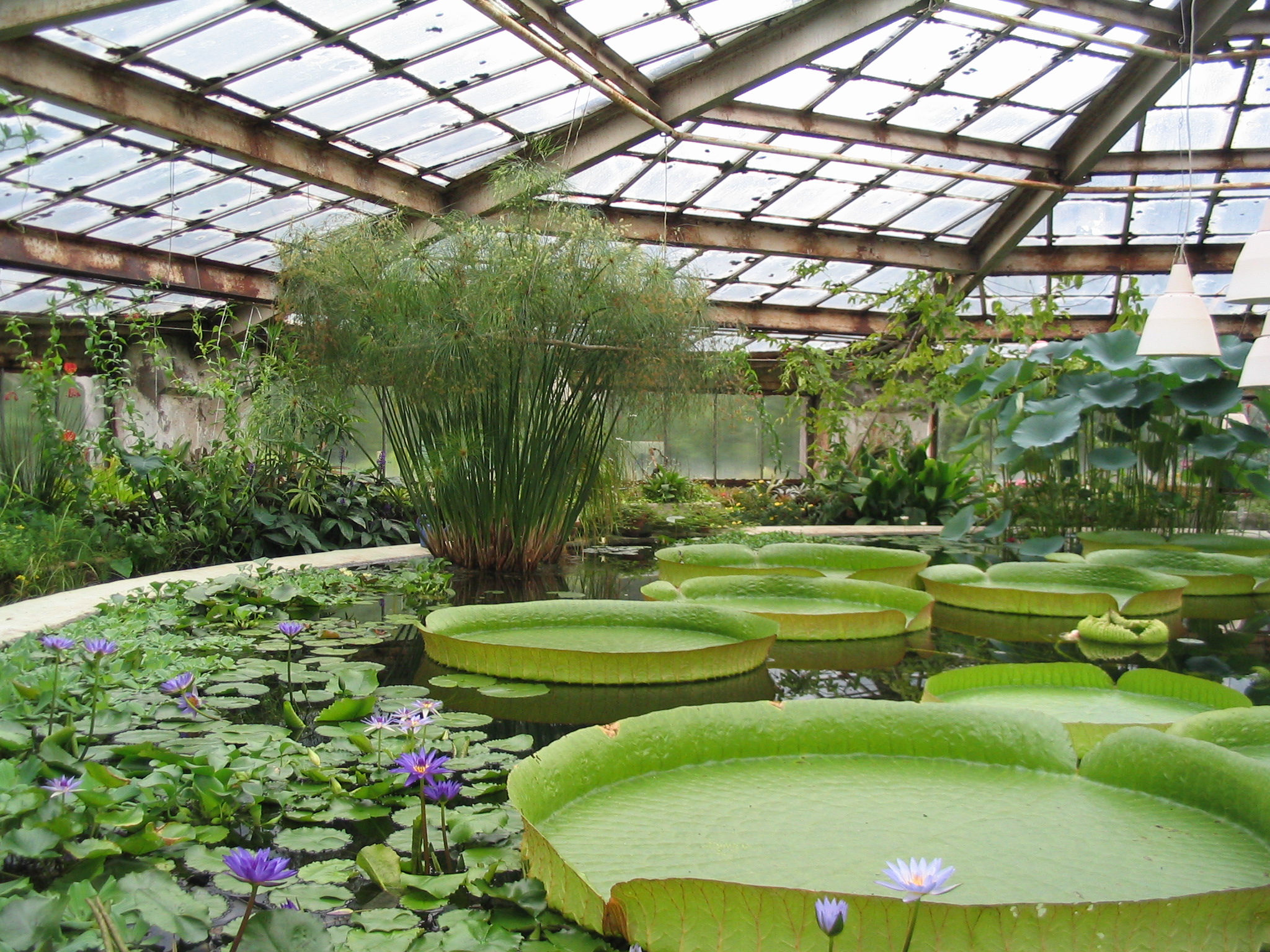
Greenhouse

Research Priority setting, Monitoring and Evaluation (PME) cell is the monitoring unit of the institute for assisting the scientists and scholars in the allocation of research areas and the monitoring and evaluation of the projects. It helps the scientists in the maintenance of database, report generation and compilation, generation and publication of research documents.

=== Technology Management Unit ===
Technology Management Unit is equipped with and manages:

- sodic and saline micro-plots for creating desired stress levels of sodicity and salinity
- environmentally controlled glass house for growing crops and monitoring their genetic resources
- Transgenic Greenhouse, under Indo-US ABSP II program
- Central laboratory with modern equipment

The institute has an administrative department, a Hindi Cell and a workshop to attend to the relevant areas of activities.

== All India Coordinated Project for Research (AICRP) ==
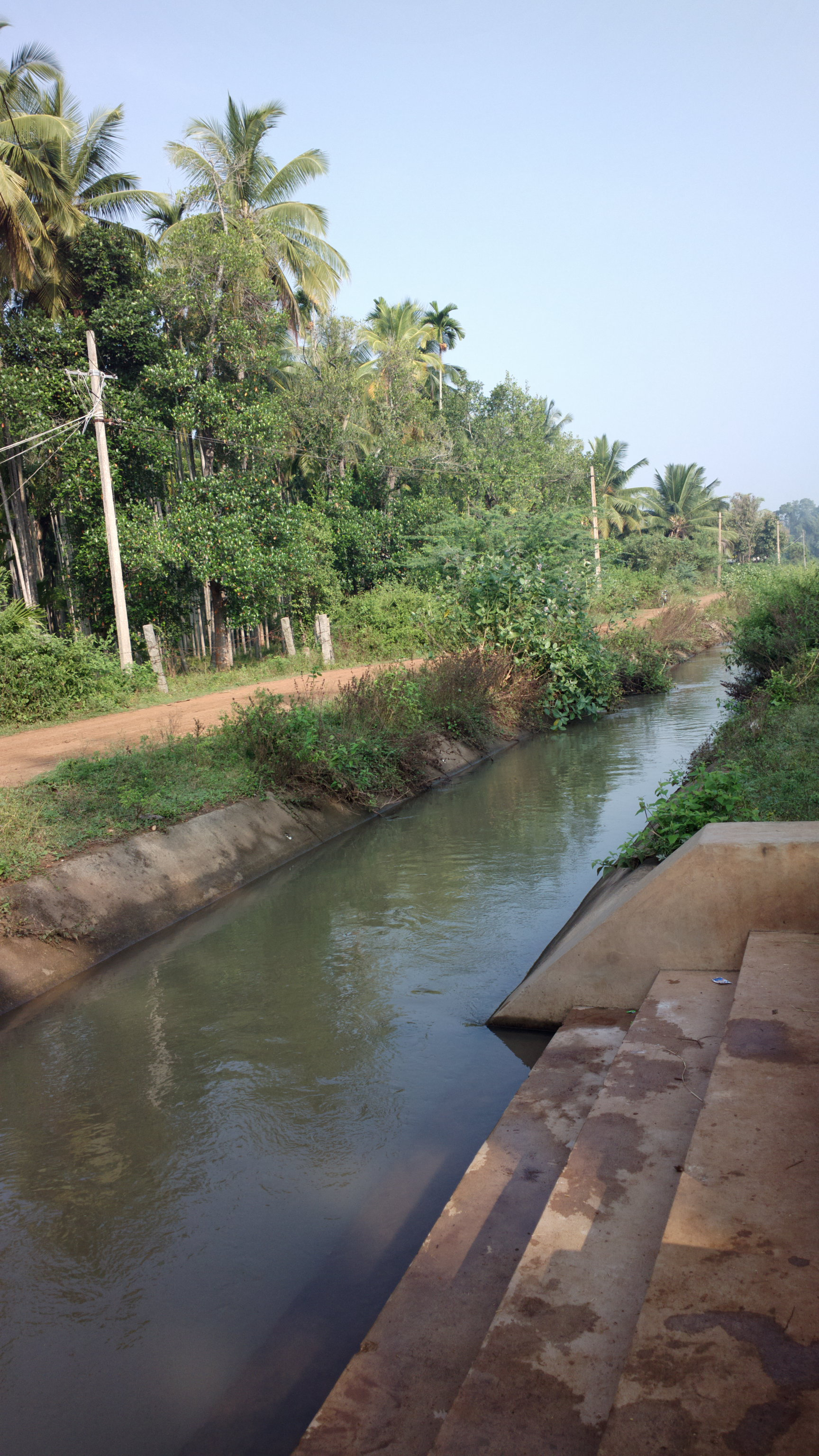
Irrigation canal near Channagiri, Davangere District, India

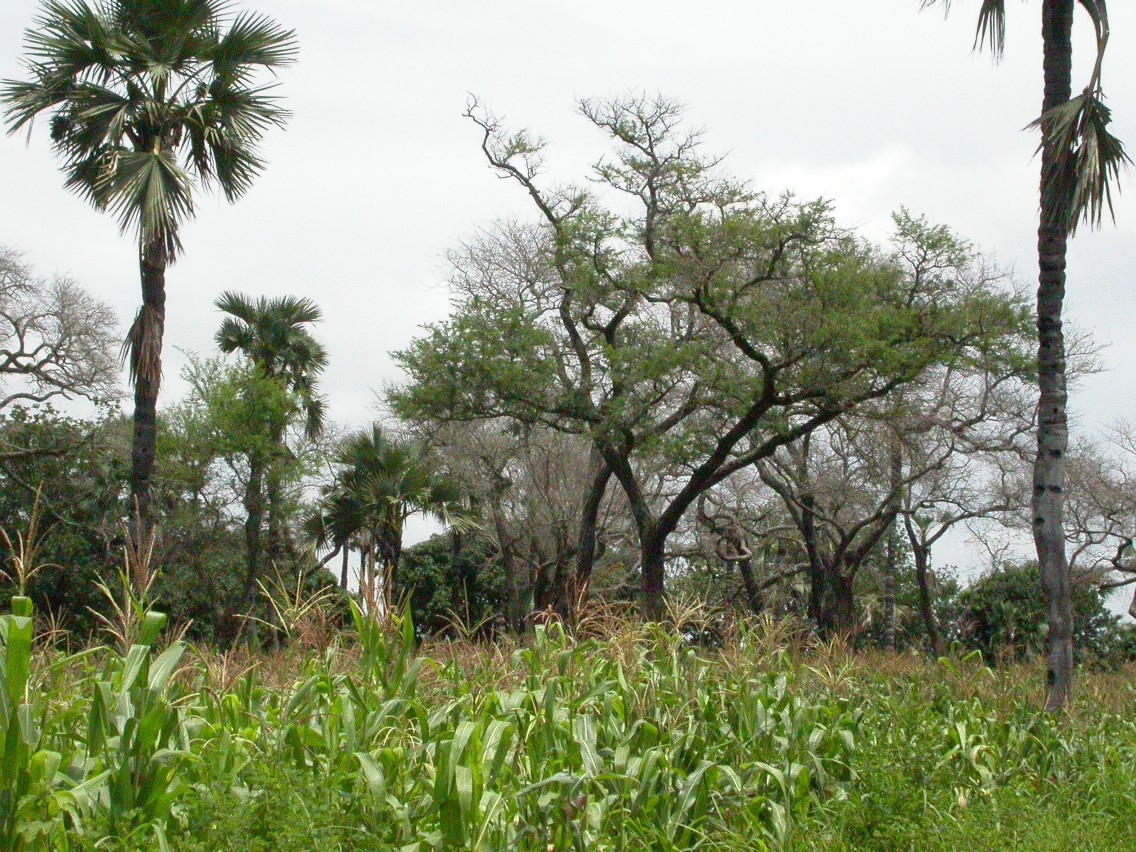
Agroforestry

The institute is the coordinating unit for the All India Coordinated Project for Research on Management of Salt Affected Soils and Use of Saline Water in Agriculture. The research is conducted at nine centres viz. Agra, Bapatla, Gangawati, Kanpur, Indore, Bikaner, Pali, Hisar and Tiruchirapalli.

The project is mandated with the responsibility to:

- Conduct survey and characterize the salt affected soils and the quality of ground water in various irrigation commands.
- Develop guidelines and standardize procedures for the assessment of irrigation waters.
- Conduct studies on the effect of poor quality water on soil and crops.
- Prescribe practice norms for utilization of water with high salinity/ alkalinity and toxic ions.
- Prepare strategies for the reclamation of salt affected soils.
- Prescribe alternate methods of using salt affected soils by way of agroforestry, bio-drainage and multi-enterprise cultivation such as medicinal and aromatic plants.
- Identify and develop crop cultivars and trees suitable for cultivation in salinity and alkalinity soil conditions.

== Awards and recognitions ==
CSSRI has been recognised for its efforts by way of several awards.

- ICAR Best Institute Award for the year 1998
- "Sardar Patel Outstanding ICAR Institution Award" for the year 2009
- Groundwater Augmentation Award- 2009 of Ministry of Water Resources (Government of India)
- Ganesh Shankar Vidyarthi Hindi Krishi Patrika Puraskar" for the year 2009
- Ganesh Shankar Vidyarthi Hindi Krishi Patrika Puraskar" for the year 2008

== Publications ==
CSSRI has published many books, some of the notable ones are:

- D. D. Dubey; O. P. Sharma; et al. (1993). Salt Affected Soils of Gujarat Extent, Nature and Management. Central Soil Salinity Research Institute.
- Central Soil Salinity Research Institute (1997). Vision-2020, CSSRI perspective plan. Worldcat.org. OCLC 44167444.
- Central Soil Salinity Research Institute (1998). 25 years of Research on Management of Salt-Affected Soil and use Lime Water in Agriculture. Central Soil Salinity Research Institute. Archived from the original on 13 September 2014.
- Central Soil Salinity Research Institute (1998). 50 Years of Natural Resource Management Research. Central Soil Salinity Research Institute. Archived from the original on 13 September 2014.
- Central Soil Salinity Research Institute (2005). Crop Improvement for Management of Salt Affected Soils, Manual of Lectures for the training program on 'Methods of Screening and Development of Varieties and Germplasm of various crops for Salt affected soils' held at CSSRI, Karnal, Jan 17-22. Central Soil Salinity Research Institute. Archived from the original on 13 September 2014.
- J. S. Samra; Gurbachan Singh; J. C. Dagar (2004). Drought Management Strategies in India. Central Soil Salinity Research Institute. OCLC 124541523.
- Gurbachan Singh; P. C. Sharma; S. K. Ambast; B. K. Khosla (2006). CSSRI: A journey to excellence. Central Soil Salinity Research Institute. OCLC 191696786.
- S. K. Ambast; S. K. Gupta; Gurbachan Singh (2007). Agricultural Land Drainage: Reclamation of Waterlogged Saline Lands. Central Soil Salinity Research Institute. Archived from the original on 13 September 2014.
- S. K. Gupta; S. K. Ambast; Gurbachan Singh; N. P. S. Yadhuvanshi (2007). Technological options for improved agriculture in Tsunami affected Andaman & Nicobar islands and Maldives. Central Soil Salinity Research Institute. Archived from the original on 13 September 2014.
- M. J. Kaledhonkar; S. K. Gupta; D. S. Bundela; Gurbachan Singh (2007). On-Farm Land and Water Management. Central Soil Salinity Research Institute. Archived from the original on 13 September 2014.
- N. K. Tyagi; P. S. Minhas (1998). Agricultural Salinity Management in India. Central Soil Salinity Research Institute. OCLC 42981963.
- Gurbachan Singh; N. T. Singh (1993). Agroforestry in Salt affected Soils. Central Soil Salinity Research Institute. OCLC 44118493.
- G B Singh; B R Sharma (1999). Fifty years of Natural Resource Management Research. Central Soil Salinity Research Institute. OCLC 56951183.
- Central Soil Salinity Research Institute (1980). International Symposium on Salt affected soils. Central Soil Salinity Research Institute. OCLC 8753432.
- Central Soil Salinity Research Institute (1998). Twenty five years of research on management of salt affected soils & use of saline water in agriculture. Central Soil Salinity Research Institute. Archived from the original on 13 September 2014.
- Central Soil Salinity Research Institute (1998). Salinity Management in Agriculture. Central Soil Salinity Research Institute. Archived from the original on 13 September 2014.
- G. P. Bhargava (2003). Training Manual for undertaking studies on genesis of sodic/alkali soils. Central Soil Salinity Research Institute. OCLC 729215690.

The institute has also published many technical bulletins, newsletters, popular articles and research papers.

== See also ==
- Agriculture
- Agroecological restoration
- Agroecosystem
- Agroecosystem analysis
- Agronomy
- Ecology
- Organic agriculture
- Soil Science
