= Environmentalist Foundation of India =

Indian non-governmental organization

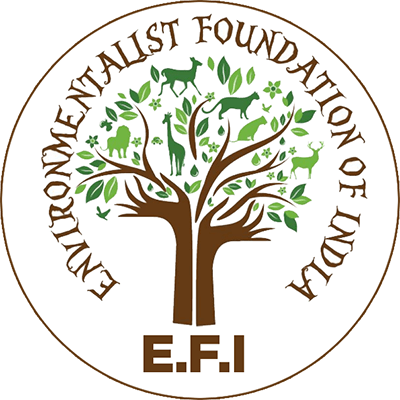
- Volunteer for India and her Environment with E.F.I
- Type: Non-governmental organization
- Founded: 2007; 19 years ago
- Headquarters: Chennai
- Area served: Pan-India
- Website: indiaenvironment.org

The Environmentalist Foundation of India (E.F.I) is an environmental conservation group based out of Chennai, Hyderabad, Puducherry, Bangalore, Trivandrum, Mumbai, Delhi, Kolkata and Coimbatore which focuses on wildlife conservation and habitat restoration. Started in 2007 and registered in 2011, the organisation is known for its work in cleaning and scientific restoration of lakes in India for biodiversity. The organisation and its efforts grew from one pond in Chennai to include over 167 water bodies in Andhra Pradesh, Chhattisgarh, Delhi, Gujarat, Jammu & Kashmir, Karnataka, Kerala, Madhya Pradesh, Maharashtra, Odisha, Puducherry, Rajasthan, Tamil Nadu, Telangana, Uttar Pradesh and West Bengal in the last 14 years (2007 to 2021).

== Activities ==
E.F.I focuses on restoration of lakes, flora, care of stray animals and a village development programme. Most of the organisation's work is carried out through volunteer support. E.F.I organises lake clean ups every Sunday and as of 2014 had cleaned 39 lakes across India. This includes Madambakkam, Keezhkattalai, Narayanapuram, Karasangal and Arasankazhani lakes in Chennai; the Selvachintamani Kulam in Coimbatore; and the Kapra, Alwal, Gurunadham Cheruvu lakes in Hyderabad.

In the cases of Arasankazhani lake and the Selvachintamani Kulam, the projects were executed through public funding in the first and government support for the second. The lakes now have G-shaped central islands for the birds to nest and fish to spawn. These geometric central islands are a first of its kind, with wind barrier capabilities and roosting facilities. The lakes also have percolation trenches and parallel bunds which ensure water retention and trapping of garbage.

E.F.I is also involved in the setting up of herbal biodiversity gardens at schools and special interest zones. The idea behind the herbal gardens are to increase people's interest in green cover and live healthy with native Indian herbs. E.F.I's "Clean for Olive Green" is a beach clean up project that is organised every year in the months of December to May to keep Chennai's beaches clean for the nesting Sea Turtle Mothers. E.F.I is active in Chennai, Hyderabad, Coimbatore, Delhi, Srinagar and Thiruvananthapuram. The organisation is known for cleaning the beach stretch between Veli and Vizhinjiam in Thiruvananthapuram part of the Beach Habitat Restoration.

Ramanujar Pond Restoration in Kanchipuram. An ancient waterbody, located in front of the Sri Ramanujar Sannadhi at Sevilimedu in Kancheepuram taluk, was revived by the Environmentalist Foundation of India (E.F.I). The work coincided with the 1,000th birth anniversary of Sri Ramanuja.

== Narendra Modi–Xi Jinping summit and E.F.I Lake Restoration ==
To commemorate the historic Indo-China summit 2019 at Mamallapuram, E.F.I took on the task of reviving the Konneri Tank. A lake adjacent to the monuments in the UNESCO World Heritage town. The tank named so owing to its shape of a sitting cow was restored in time for the summit. Deepening of the water body, clearing invasive weeds, planting native saplings, establishing G-shaped nesting islands were all part of the restoration effort.

== EFI Chidambaram ==
With the administrative support from the then District Sub Collector Mr. Vishu Mahajan IAS, E.F.I signed an MOU with administration to revive nine water bodies in the temple town of Chidambaram over 2 years. These include the historic Omakulam, Nagachery kulam, Gnanaprakasam pond, Ayee Kulam and other water bodies such as Thatchan Kulam, Periya Anna Kulam, Chinna Anna Kulam, Kumaran Kulam, Palaman Kulam. As of 2020 October work was completed in the first four and the remaining 5 to be worked on in 2021. This effort was further supported by Mr. Madhu Balan IAS who took over from Mr. Vishu. Active participation from community volunteers strengthened this effort by E.F.I.

== EFI Trivandrum ==
Environmentalist Foundation of India started operations in Trivandrum by cleaning the Veli lake front. The efforts extended to cleaning of the Karimadom Colony pond. The organization is working towards the eco-restoration of the pond located in the heart of Trivandrum. In addition to this the organization runs awareness drives around the Thettiyaar, Parvathy Puthanar and Aakulam water reserves. These are done through Lake Safaris and other EFI outreach programs.

== E.F.I Hyderabad ==
E.F.I volunteers at nine lakes across Hyderabad. This includes the Kapra Lake, Madinaguda Lake, Gangaram Cheruvu, Gurunadham Cheruvu, Alwal lake and others. Several volunteers come together over the weekends to voluntarily clean up the lakes of physical garbage.

== E.F.I Bangalore ==
E.F.I volunteers removed close to 3 tonnes of garbage from the Hebbal lake on the 18 June 2017. Several like minded citizens continue to volunteer over the weekend to clean up the Hebbal Lake. Efforts are also on to volunteer for lakes in South and North East Bangalore.

== E.F.I Coimbatore ==
E.F.I volunteers across several lakes in Coimbatore ranging from the Selvachintamani Kulam, Kumarasamy Kulam and others. The organization has a dedicated rural program covering areas of Thondamuthur, Karamadai and Madukkarai. E.F.I recruits volunteers through several school programs and students actively participate in supporting E.F.I's efforts. E.F.I released a documentary titled 'Coimbatore's Last Drop' in 2017. Aimed at increasing public awareness on water conservation. E.F.I also organizes regular Lake Safaris in Coimbatore to sensitize the public on the depleting state of lakes in the city.

In 2021, the organization had taken on the restoration of four water bodies close to the Kalapatti region in Coimbatore, namely the Kaliaperumal Koil Kulam, Kalam Park Kuttai, Kalapatti Lake and the Thottipalayam Lake. The restorations were inaugurated and flagged off by the Coimbatore Collector Thiru Sameeran GS IAS and Coimbatoe Municipal Corporation Commissioner Thiru Raja Gopal Sunakara IAS on September 1, 2021.

== E.F.I Chennai ==
The Environmentalist Foundation of India's weekend voluntary clean ups are a regular in lakes such as Keezhkattalai, Madambakkam, Tiruneermalai, Adambakkam, Perumbakkam, Sithalapakkam, Mudichur lakes. These clean ups see several volunteers such as students, working class and senior citizen participating.

An eco-park named Kanagam was established in Anna Nagar to ensure sustainability and move away from the idea of ecologically damaging construction in any way. The project is being executed in collaboration with the Government of Tamil Nadu and the Greater Chennai Corporation under the Namakku Naame scheme.

== 2016 lake restorations in Chennai ==
Post the 2015 floods, E.F.I's role in mobilizing volunteers and restoring freshwater bodies in Chennai became furthermore important. Immediately post the monsoons, the organization started working on restoration of three ponds within the Perungalathur Town Panchayat. Following which scientific restoration efforts were undertaken at the Arasankazhani Lake, Karasangal Lake, Mudichur Ponds, Karasangal Pond and West Mambalam Pond.

== 2017 lake restorations ==
E.F.I worked on the restoration of 29 water bodies in 2017. This included the restoration of the Thumbikairayen pond near Thondamuthur in the district as part of its water-body rejuvenation initiative. One pond in Nagapattinam and one in Chellaperumal Nagar at Sriperumbudur in Tamil Nadu were restored by E.F.I with support from the Better India group. The Omakulam at Madhavaram in Chennai was restored by E.F.I in partnership with the Greater Chennai Corporation and Chennai City Connect. Noted Carnatic Singer Smt. Sudhaa Ragunathan through her social group Samudhaaya Foundation supported E.F.I in restoring two ponds at Thiruvaiyaaru in Tamil Nadu E.F.I worked on the restoration of 7 rural ponds in the Tirunelveli district. This included water bodies in Ambasamudram Taluk.

== 2018 lake restoration ==
E.F.I worked on restoring nearly 37 water bodies in the year 2018. This included the Malliankaranai Pond establishment project in Uthiramerur. Following which E.F.I started work on the ecological restoration of the Gerugambakkam Pond in West Chennai. The once garbage filled and weed infested water body was cleaned and restored through E.F.I's community based conservation efforts. Following the Gerugambakkam Pond Restoration E.F.I and the Greater Chennai Corporation got into an agreement to restore nearly 20 different water bodies spread across Chennai. This included the Ramachandra Nagar Pond, Theeyambakkam Pond, Vinayagapuram Pond and others. The organization also took on the scientific restoration of the Sholinganallur Lake located on the arterial IT Corridor of O.M.R in South Chennai.

The Minjur pond restoration in North Chennai, Vinayagapuram pond restoration in North West Chennai near Puzhal Lake were also completed in 2018. Arresting the inflow of sewage, clearing the water bodies of non-degradable trash, construction debris and invasive weeds was part of the eco restoration efforts. These water bodies are today important ground water recharge sites.

== 2019 lake/pond restorations ==
The year started early and on a positive note for E.F.I with the first restoration project kick starting at Thazhambur in Chennai. The abandoned Thazhambur pond was taken up for ecological restoration and through scientific means. The restoration at Thazhambur received overwhelming public support through active citizen volunteering. 3 Ponds in the Kinathukadavu suburb of Coimbatore were restored by E.F.I between January and March 2019. A total of seven ponds in the region have been adopted out of which three were completed by March. These ponds part of a system are important for local agriculture and drinking water. The Sam Nagar pond near Manali in North West Chennai was restored by E.F.I in March 2019. The pond located within the burial ground was to be slowly converted into a dumping site, however is now revived and ecologically restored. Water bodies in the periphery of the Palliakranai Marsh were given priority in 2019 part of E.F.I's efforts. This includes the Mandapam Kuttai, Puliyakeni and Nattar Street ponds of Velachery, the Pillayar Koil Kulam at Pallikaranai, The Nehru Nagar Pond at Karappakam on OMR, the Kannan Kulam and Kattabomman Pond at Thoraipakkam.

== 2020 Lakes/Pond restorations ==
The entire world was gripped by the COVID Pandemic, this brought to a temporary halt the lake/pond restoration efforts at E.F.I. Big projects such as the 257 acres Madambakkam Lake Restoration The 73 acres Koladi Lake Restoration The Ayapakkam Lake part restoration at Aparna Nagar, The Thirumulaivoyal Pond Restoration, The Mittanamalli Lake Restoration, The Vandalur ORR Lake Restoration, The Nedunkundram Samiyar Pond and Gandhi Road Pond, The Anaikeni Pond Restoration were all completed in Chennai. Aurangabad Shenpunji Lake Restoration, Vijaywada Pedda Cheruvu, Konai Cheruvu and Vura Cheruvu, Visakapatnam Vura Cheruvu, Hubli Rayanal Kere, Ahmedabad Makarba Lake, Indore Kanadiya Lake, Tuticorin Puthupatti Lake etc were also worked on in 2020 A pan India Lake/pond restoration effort.

== Revival of tributaries ==
E.F.I worked on the restoration of the Seekana Channel which leads from Mudichur's Seekana Lake to the Adyar River in South West Chennai. The channel which had an overgrowth of weed, garbage dumping and other issues was worked upon over 3 months and completely revived. This included the deepening of the channel, elevating the bunds and regulating the water flow. The restoration of the channel ensured prevention of flooding in areas such as Madhanapuram and Parvathy Nagar of Mudichur.

== Dal Lake ==
E.F.I in association with a local group called Arastha in Srinagar in Jammu & Kashmir is involved in a multi-phase community based conservation of the Dal Lake. The two-year-long effort is voluntary with involvement from local citizens, shikaras, houseboat owners and the students in Srinagar. The efforts are aimed at cleaning the Dal Lake and maintaining it as an ecologically sensitive habitat.

== Water security mission ==
The Government of Tamil Nadu launched a water security mission in the year 2015. The project is to focus on 15 lakes around Chennai which would be cleaned and scientifically restored. The Chennai Metro water is the nodal agency and Environmentalist Foundation of India is the executing NGO partner. 15 lakes chosen included the Madambakkam, Perumbakkam, Mudichur, Thiruverkadu, Keezhkattalai, Medavakkam, Adambakkam, Arasankazhani, Madipakkam, Puzhithivakkam lakes and more. This is seen as an effort to improve Chennai's water table and conserve these ecological habitats.

== E.F.I's documentaries on water ==
E.F.I at a regular interval produces environmental documentary films. These films are used for public outreach efforts at schools, colleges, work environments. The organization has made three documentaries: "Chennai's Lakes" "Chennai's Rivers" and "Coimbatore's Last Drop". It is working on similar documentaries on Pondicherry's Lakes and Bengaluru's Last Drop.

== Lake Savaari ==
In an effort to connect people with environment, Environmentalist Foundation of India is organising a weekly Lake Savaari. Lake Savaari is an ecological safari aimed at increasing public awareness on freshwater habitats in Chennai. The safari is a free guided trip in which participants are taken to six lakes in Chennai where the Geology-Hydrology and Biodiversity are briefly explained. The lake safari is a 3-hour guided tour starting and ending at Thiruvanmiyur covering the Sholinganallur Pond, Arasankazhani Lake, Perumbakkam Lake, Medavakkam Lake and Narayanapuram Lake. E.F.I's lake safari in Coimbatore are scheduled over weekends and is a guided ecological tour with Sanjay Prasad E.F.I's Coimbatore coordinator.

== Cyclakes ==
To enthuse the public on the need for conservation of freshwater bodies, E.F.I has initiated Cyclakes. A campaign aimed at encouraging people to cycle to their neighborhood lakes to learn more about their freshwater bodies. The effort rolled out in Chennai, Bangalore, Coimbatore, Pondicherry and Hyderabad is a weekend activity where participants are taken on a guided ecological tour to series of lakes. Every stopover is one of the city's lakes where stories related to the lakes ecology, revival etc. are shared.

== E.F.I's Hydrostan ==
'Hydrostan' a video series launched by the Environmental Film Association (E.F.A) which is part of E.F.I. Through the series several documentaries on rivers of Tamil Nadu and other inspiring water stories are documented and made available for the general public. Aimed at increasing public awareness on water conservation, the screenings happen every weekend in Chennai and the videos are available on YouTube for public viewing.

== E.F.I's public awareness wall paintings ==
Part of its outreach efforts, E.F.I has teamed up with the Southern Railway, Chennai Metro Rail Corporation and Greater Chennai Corporation to paint public walls with environment outreach information. Named "Wall.E" the effort has spread to eight cities in 2017.

== Founding ==
E.F.I was founded by Arun Krishnamurthy when initiated the cleaning of a pond in Mudichur and a lake in Hyderabad. The organisation's approach to recruit volunteers through school and college orientation programmes received support with many students joining them. E.F.I's team received support from like minded people across the spectrum who joined them as volunteers in their Sunday clean ups.

== Recognition ==
- British Council International Climate Champion Excellence Award in 2010.
- Google Alumni Impact Award in 2011.
- Rolex Awards for Enterprise award in 2012 for cleaning Lake Kilkattalai in Chennai.
- Jane Goodall Institute Global Youth Leadership Award, 2010.
- Youth Action Net Fellow.

The E.F.I has received voluntary support from celebrities of film industry as well, including Kamal Hasan and Trisha Krishnan.

In 2022, the Hon. Prime Minister Narendra Modi had acknowledged E.F.I's conservation efforts in restoring over 170 water bodies across the country.
