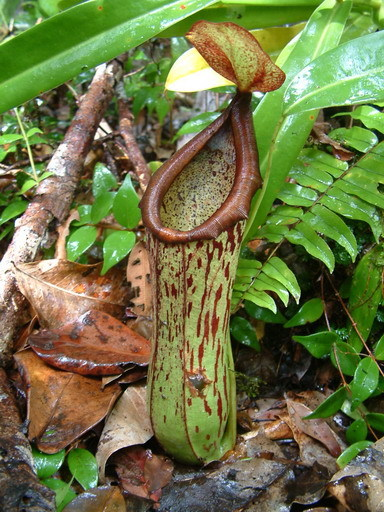

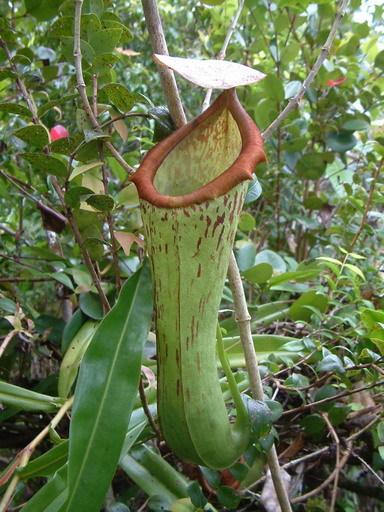
- A lower (top) and an upper pitcher

Scientific classification
- Kingdom: Plantae
- Clade: Tracheophytes
- Clade: Angiosperms
- Clade: Eudicots
- Order: Caryophyllales
- Family: Nepenthaceae
- Genus: Nepenthes
- Species: N. biak

Binomial name
- Nepenthes biak Jebb & Cheek (2018)

= Nepenthes biak =

Species of pitcher plant

Nepenthes biak is a tropical pitcher plant endemic to the Indonesian island of Biak, after which it is named. Biak is a member of the Schouten Islands, located in Cenderawasih Bay, and is administered as part of Biak Numfor Regency, Papua Province. Nepenthes biak grows near sea level, usually on limestone coastal cliffs though occasionally as an epiphyte on mangrove trees.

== Taxonomy ==
Prior to its formal description, N. biak was lumped with the closely related N. insignis, which is now considered to be restricted to the New Guinea mainland.

Nepenthes biak is a member of section Insignes, which also includes 13 other species, mostly from the Philippines: N. aenigma, N. alzapan, N. barcelonae, N. bellii, N. burkei, N. insignis, N. merrilliana, N. northiana (a questionable outlier from Borneo), N. samar, N. sibuyanensis, N. surigaoensis, N. ventricosa, and N. sp. Raja Ampat. Its closest relatives are thought to be N. insignis and the undescribed N. sp. Raja Ampat from the Raja Ampat Islands.

The type specimen, Cheek 18785, originates from Biak. It was prepared on 25 August 2017 from a plant cultivated at Kew Gardens in London and originally donated by Robert Cantley. The holotype is held at the herbarium of the University of Papua in Manokwari (MAN), with isotypes at Kew Herbarium (K), the National Herbarium of the Netherlands in Leiden (L), and Herbarium Bogoriense (BO) of the Bogor Botanical Gardens.
