= Nepenthes × tsangoya =

Scientific classification
- Kingdom: Plantae
- Clade: Tracheophytes
- Clade: Angiosperms
- Clade: Eudicots
- Order: Caryophyllales
- Family: Nepenthaceae
- Genus: Nepenthes
- Species: N. × tsangoya

Binomial name
- Nepenthes × tsangoya Tsang ex Lauffenburger (1995) nom.nud.

Species of carnivorous plant

Nepenthes × tsangoya (/nɪˈpɛnθiːz sæŋˈɡɔɪ.ə/; after Peter Tsang) is a tropical pitcher plant. It reportedly represents the complex natural hybrid (N. alata × N. merrilliana) × N. mirabilis.

Nepenthes × tsangoya was mentioned as a natural hybrid in Guide to Nepenthes Hybrids (1995). The known ranges of the parent species only overlap in Mindanao, the Philippines.
