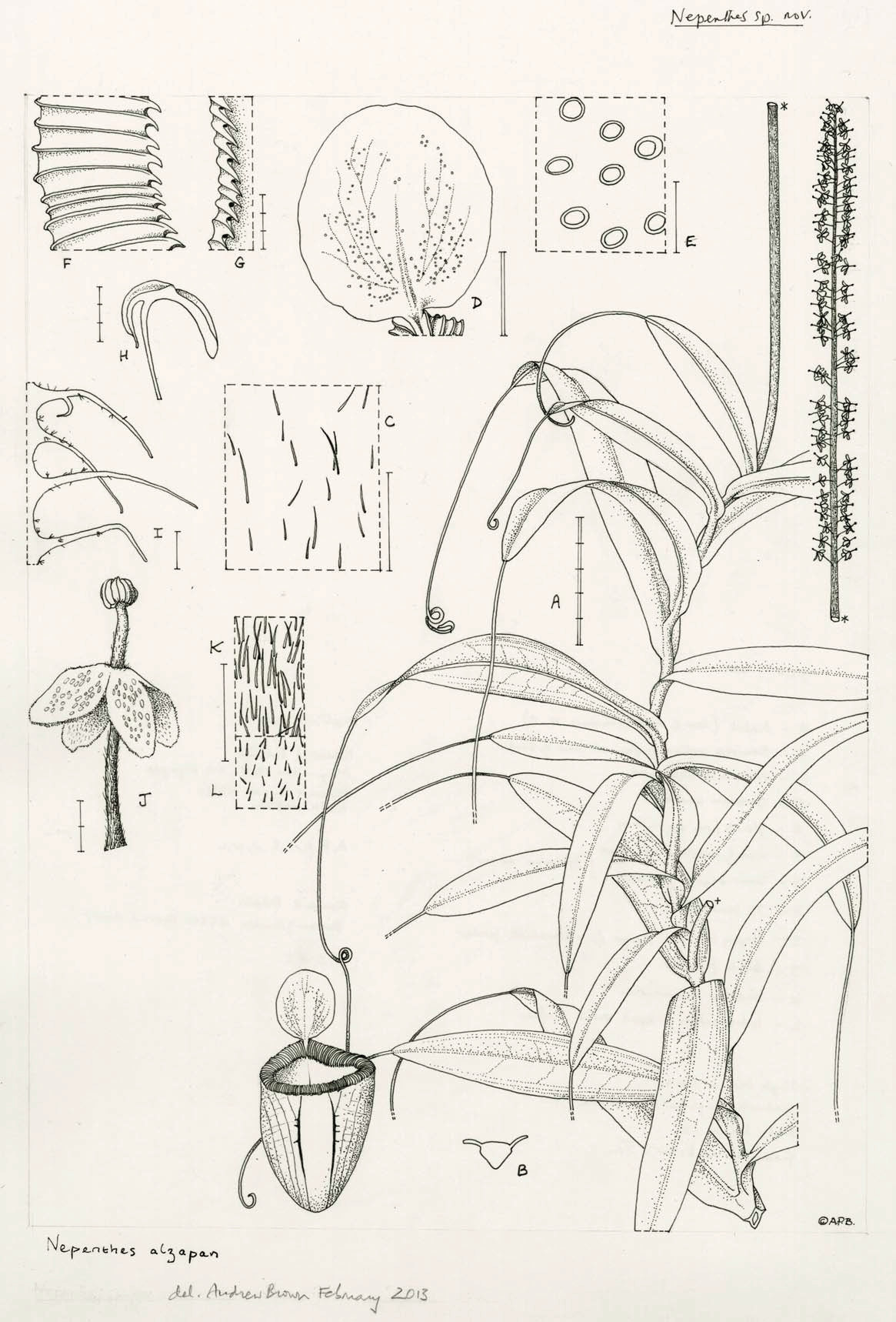
- Botanical illustration of N. alzapan from Cheek and Jebb's type description

Conservation status
- Data Deficient (IUCN 3.1)

Scientific classification
- Kingdom: Plantae
- Clade: Tracheophytes
- Clade: Angiosperms
- Clade: Eudicots
- Order: Caryophyllales
- Family: Nepenthaceae
- Genus: Nepenthes
- Species: N. alzapan

Binomial name
- Nepenthes alzapan Jebb & Cheek (2013)

= Nepenthes alzapan =

Species of pitcher plant from the Philippines

Nepenthes alzapan is a tropical pitcher plant native to the Philippine island of Luzon. It is known from only a handful of herbarium specimens collected in 1925 from submontane mossy forest at an elevation of 1800 m above sea level. It is closely allied to N. bellii and has similarly diminutive pitchers.

The specific epithet alzapan refers to Mount Alzapan in the Sierra Madre mountains, from which the type material was collected.
