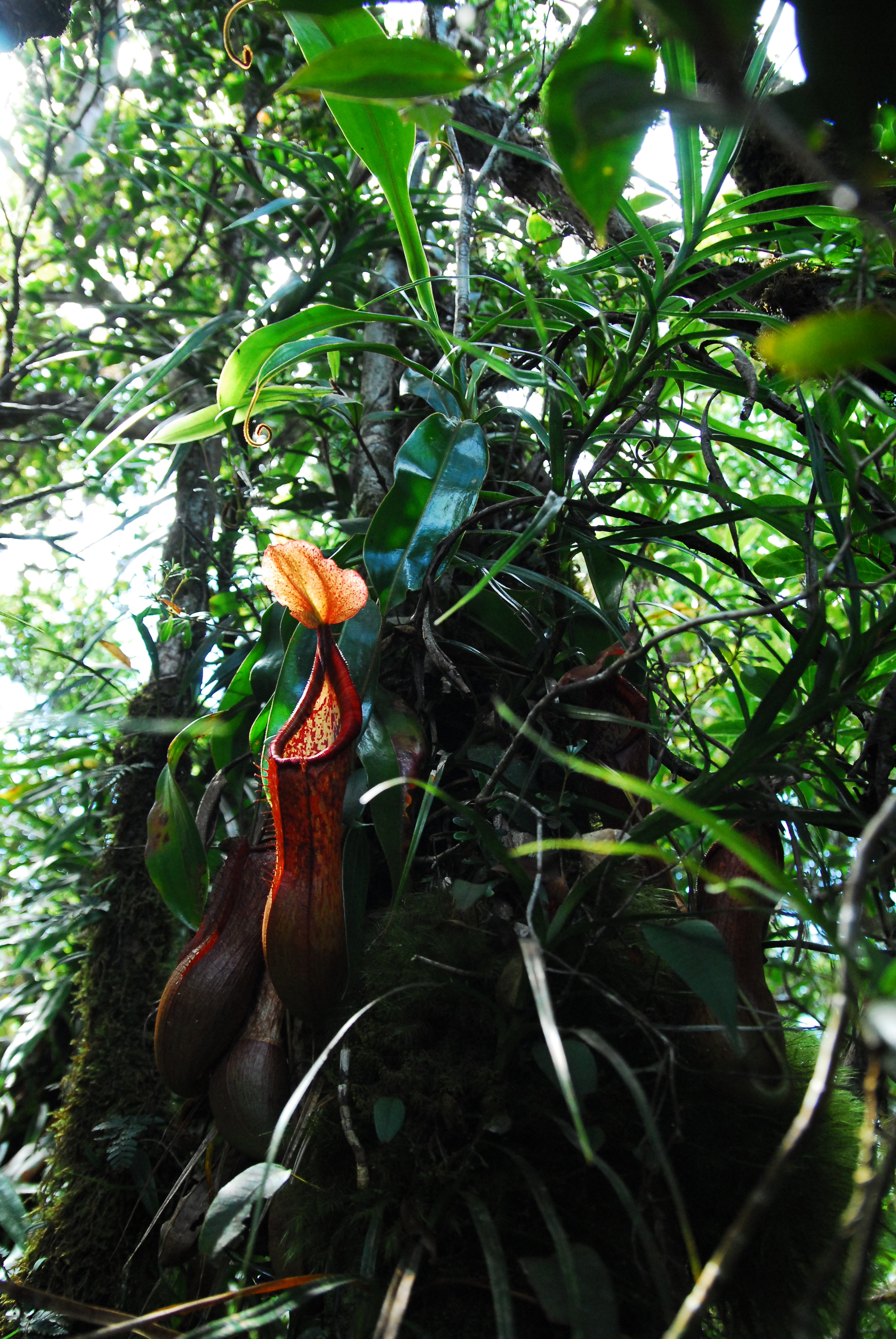
- At Mount Masay, the type locality

Conservation status
- Vulnerable (IUCN 3.1)

Scientific classification
- Kingdom: Plantae
- Clade: Tracheophytes
- Clade: Angiosperms
- Clade: Eudicots
- Order: Caryophyllales
- Family: Nepenthaceae
- Genus: Nepenthes
- Species: N. petiolata

Binomial name
- Nepenthes petiolata Danser

Synonyms
- Heterochresonyms: Nepenthes petiolata auct. non Danser: Sh.Kurata & Toyosh. (1966) [=N. mindanaoensis]

= Nepenthes petiolata =

Species of pitcher plant from the Philippines

Nepenthes petiolata (/nɪˈpɛnθiːz ˌpiːtioʊˈlɑːtə/; from Latin: petiolatus "petiolate", referring to leaf attachment) is a highland Nepenthes pitcher plant species endemic to Mindanao island in the Philippines, where it grows at an elevation of 1,450–1,900 metres (4,800–6,200 ft) above sea level.

N. petiolata holotype (Elmer 13705)

== Natural hybrids ==
- ? N. alata × N. petiolata
- ? N. petiolata × N. truncata

Nepenthes petiolata may itself have evolved from a cross between N. alata and N. truncata. Examples of other Nepenthes species with a putative hybrid origin include N. hamiguitanensis, N. hurrelliana, and N. murudensis.
