= Nepenthes samar =

Scientific classification
- Kingdom: Plantae
- Clade: Embryophytes
- Clade: Tracheophytes
- Clade: Angiosperms
- Clade: Eudicots
- Order: Caryophyllales
- Family: Nepenthaceae
- Genus: Nepenthes
- Species: N. samar

Binomial name
- Nepenthes samar Jebb & Cheek (2013)

Species of pitcher plant from the Philippines

Nepenthes samar is a tropical pitcher plant native to the Philippines. It is known only from the island of Samar, after which it is named. It is closely allied to N. merrilliana.
