= Nepenthes × merrilliata =

Scientific classification
- Kingdom: Plantae
- Clade: Tracheophytes
- Clade: Angiosperms
- Clade: Eudicots
- Order: Caryophyllales
- Family: Nepenthaceae
- Genus: Nepenthes
- Species: N. × merrilliata

Binomial name
- Nepenthes × merrilliata Hort. ex Fleming (1979) nom.nud.

Synonyms
- Nepenthes surigaoensis auct. non Elmer: Y.Fukatsu (1999)

Species of carnivorous plant

Nepenthes × merrilliata (/nɪˈpɛnθiːz mɛˌrɪliˈɑːtə/; a blend of merrilliana and alata) is a natural hybrid involving N. alata and N. merrilliana. Like its two parent species, it is endemic to the Philippines, but limited by the natural range of N. merrilliana to Samar as well as Mindanao and its offshore islands.
