= Nepenthes barcelonae =

Scientific classification
- Kingdom: Plantae
- Clade: Tracheophytes
- Clade: Angiosperms
- Clade: Eudicots
- Order: Caryophyllales
- Family: Nepenthaceae
- Genus: Nepenthes
- Species: N. barcelonae

Binomial name
- Nepenthes barcelonae Tandang & Cheek (2015)

Species of pitcher plant from the Philippines

Nepenthes barcelonae is a tropical pitcher plant native to the Philippine island of Luzon. It is known from a single mountain in the Sierra Madre range of Aurora Province, where it grows in stunted submontane forest.

== Etymology ==
The specific epithet barcelonae honours Julie F. Barcelona, who discovered the species in February 2014 together with Danilo Tandang and Pieter B. Pelser..

== Distribution ==
Nepenthes barcelonae inhabits stunted submontane forest at altitudes of 1500-1700 m a.s.l. in the Sierra Madre Mountains of Luzon, Philippines. The specific type locality was not included in the species description to prevent pressures upon wild populations by hobbyists. Four species of Nepenthes have been described from the northern Visayas and Luzon (at the time of the species description), of which two are found on Luzon; the closely allied Nepenthes ventricosa, which is widespread across the island, and Nepenthes alzapan. Under Criterion B2ab(iii) of IUCN 2014, the species was assessed informally as Critically Endangered by the authors - it occurred in a single location, with an area of occupancy and extent of occurrence less than 10km². It is additionally threatened by poaching, and the encroachment of habitat degradation, namely in the form of slash-and-burn agriculture and illegal logging operations, which were present at lower elevations.
