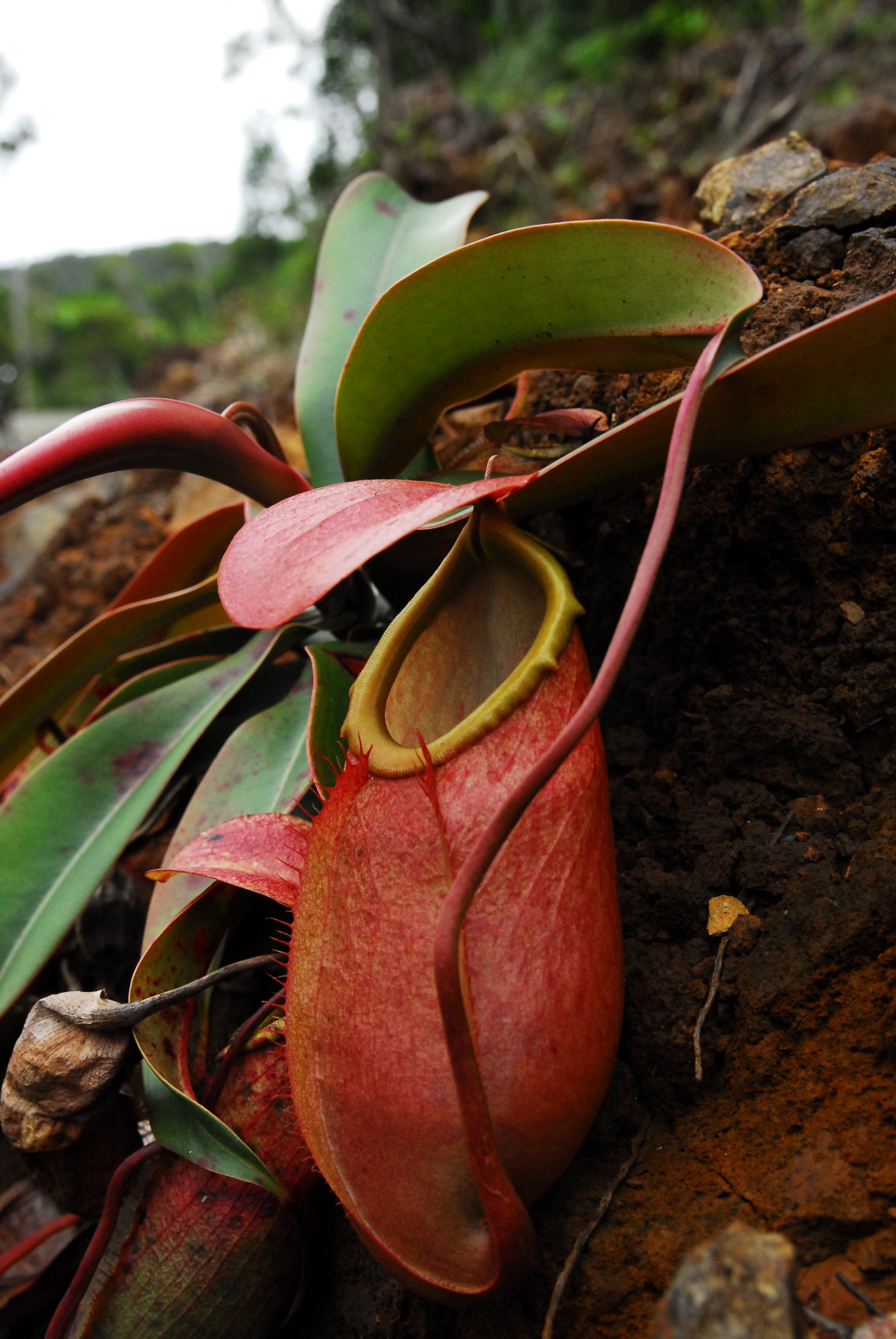

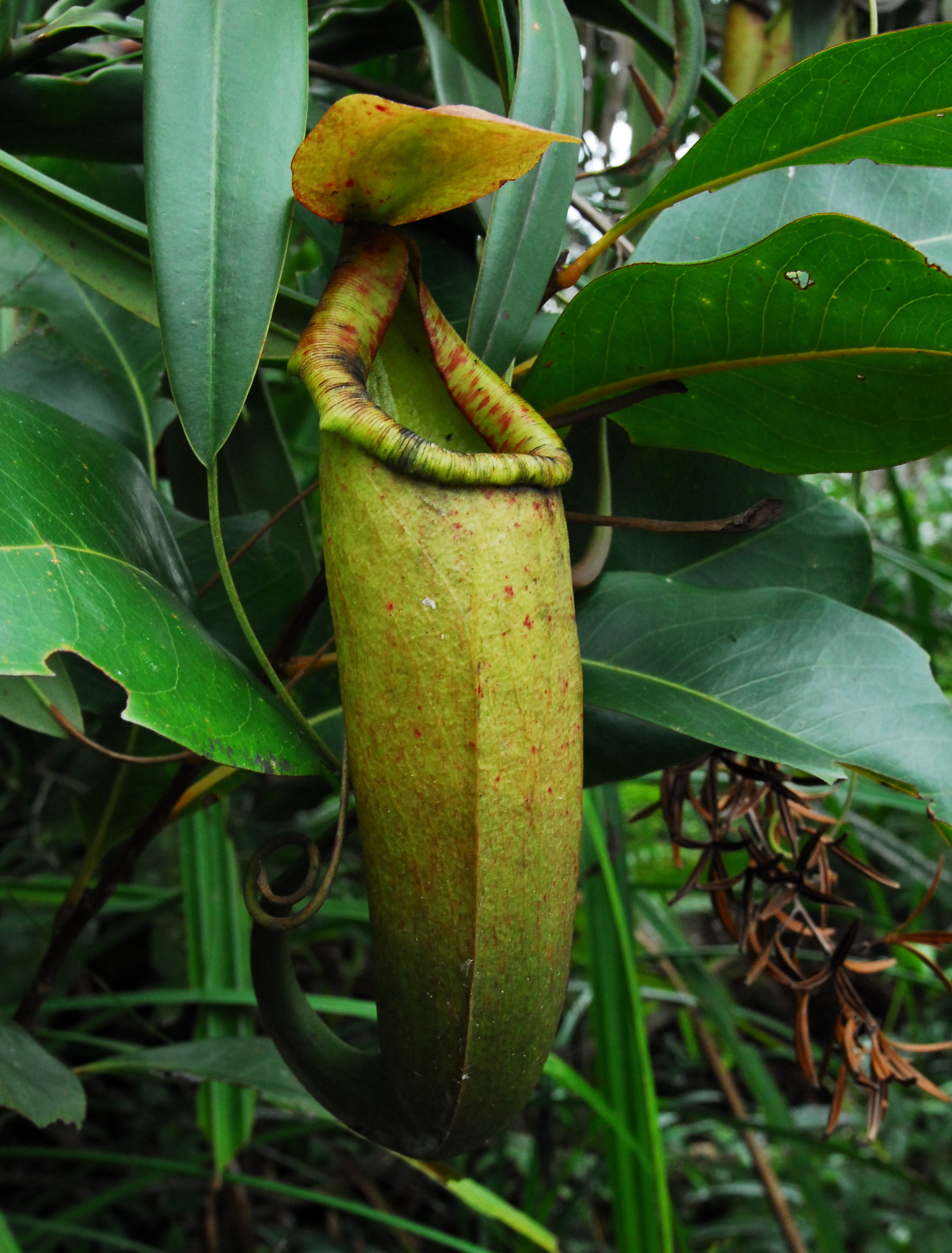
- A lower (top) and upper pitcher of N. merrilliana from Dinagat

Conservation status
- Vulnerable (IUCN 2.3)

Scientific classification
- Kingdom: Plantae
- Clade: Embryophytes
- Clade: Tracheophytes
- Clade: Angiosperms
- Clade: Eudicots
- Order: Caryophyllales
- Family: Nepenthaceae
- Genus: Nepenthes
- Species: N. merrilliana

Binomial name
- Nepenthes merrilliana Macfarl. (1911)

Synonyms
- Synonyms: Nepenthes merrillii Elm. (1915) sphalm.typogr.; Heterochresonyms: Nepenthes merrilliana auct. non Macfarl.: Danser (1928); Jebb & Cheek (1997); Cheek & Jebb (2001) [=N. merrilliana/N. surigaoensis]

= Nepenthes merrilliana =

Tropical pitcher plant endemic to the Philippines

Nepenthes merrilliana (/nɪˈpɛnθiːz mɛˌrɪliˈɑːnə/; after Elmer Drew Merrill) is a tropical pitcher plant endemic to the Philippines. It produces some of the largest pitchers in the genus, rivalling those of N. rajah.

The species is native to northern and central Mindanao as well as neighbouring Dinagat and Samar. Its presence in southern Mindanao is uncertain. It inhabits coastal forest areas on steep slopes at elevations of 0–1,100 m above sea level.

Nepenthes surigaoensis is closely related to N. merrilliana and was for a long time considered a heterotypic synonym of this species. Nepenthes samar is another closely allied species.

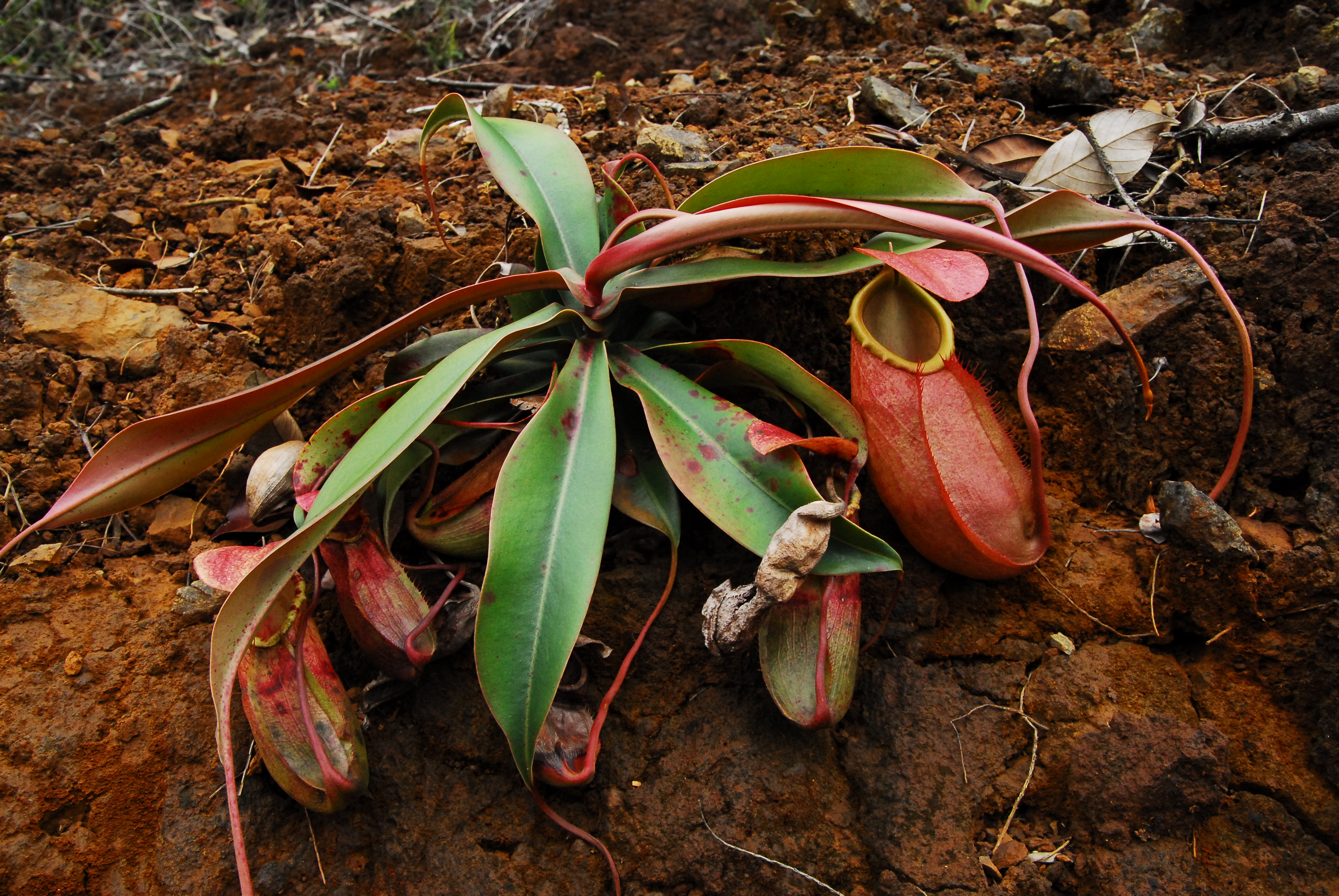
A young plant with lower pitchers growing in an exposed site

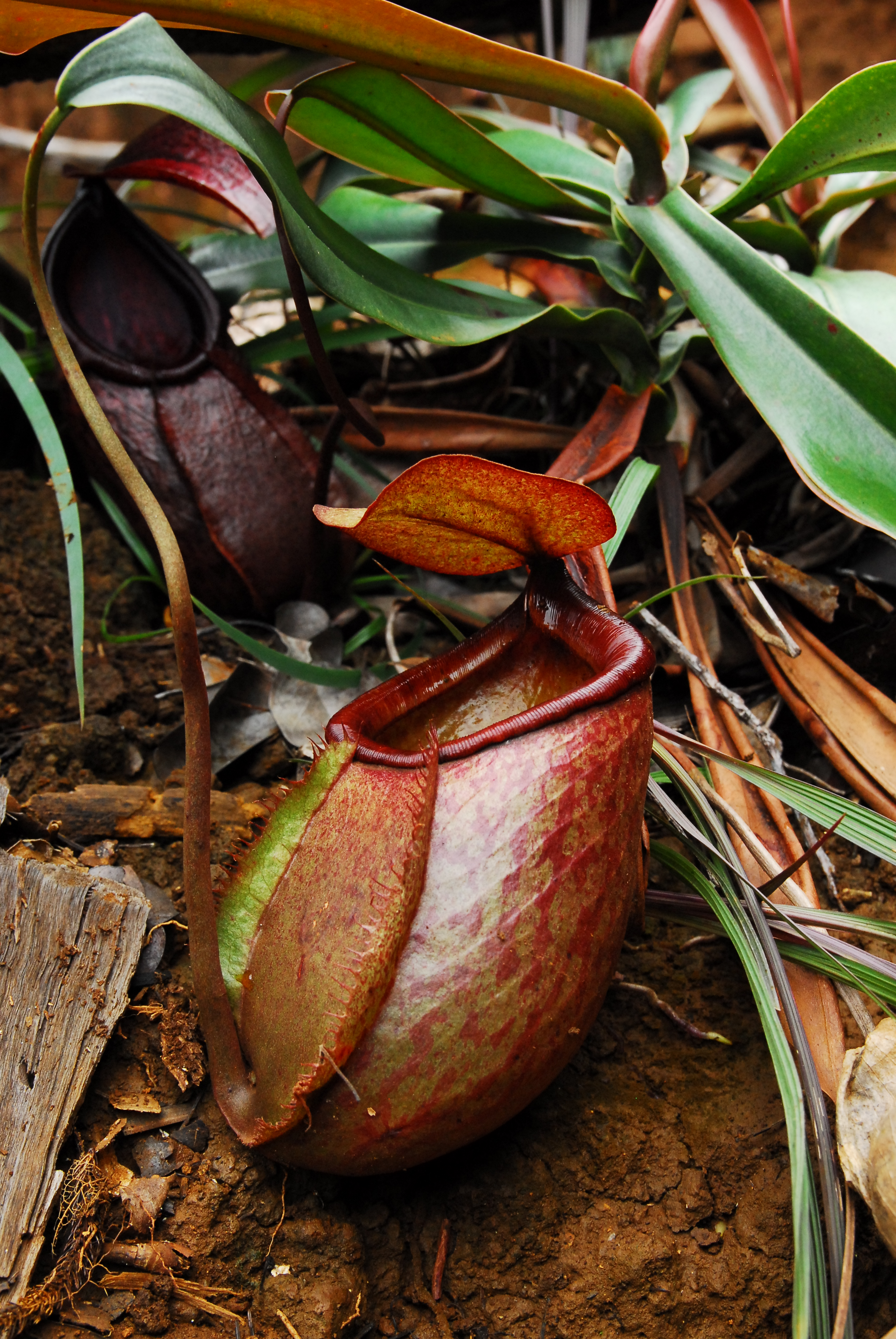
A small lower pitcher from Dinagat

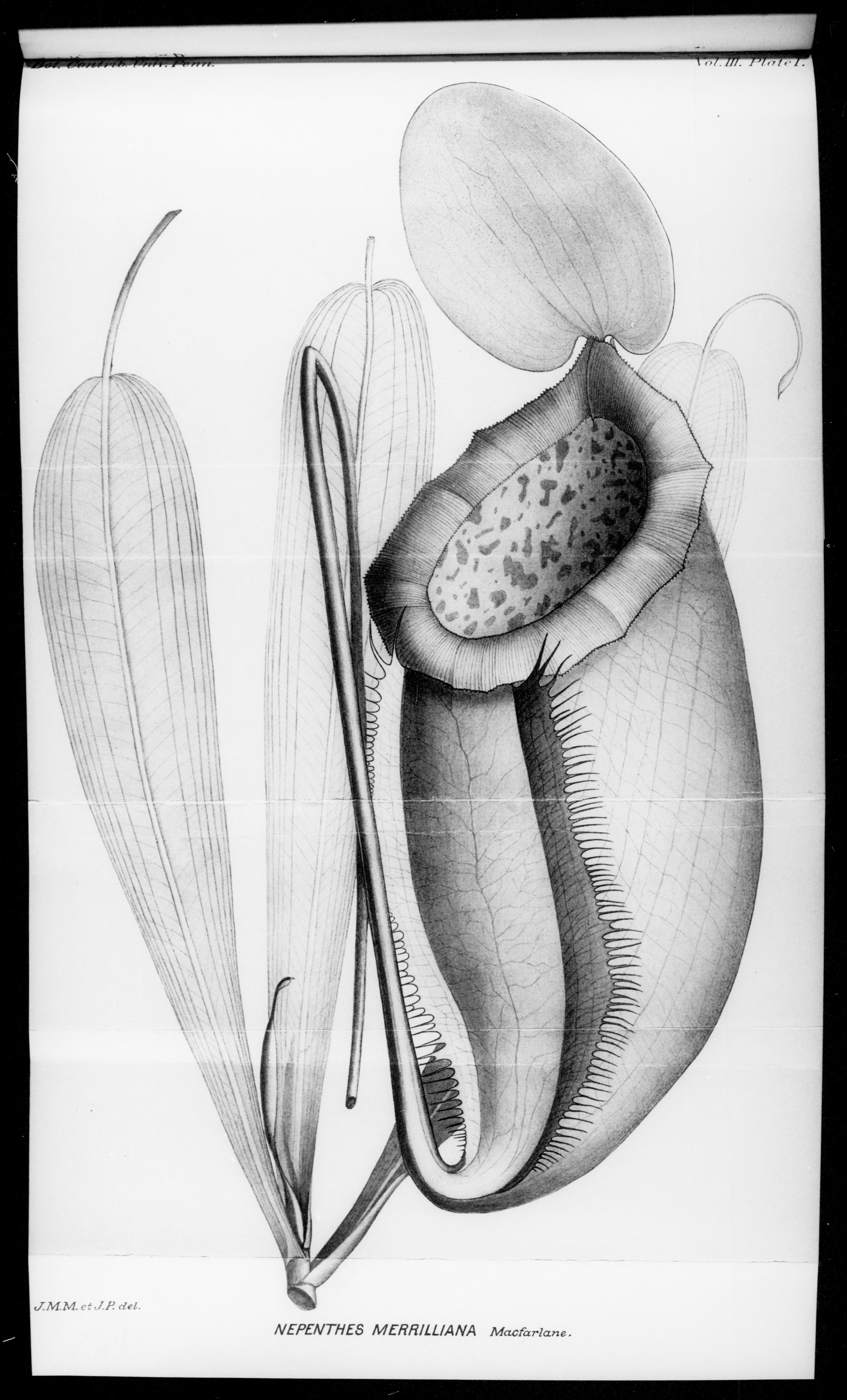
Illustration of N. merrilliana from Macfarlane's type description of 1911

== Natural hybrids ==
- N. alata × N. merrilliana [=N. × merrilliata]
- ? (N. alata × N. merrilliana) × N. mirabilis [=N. × tsangoya]
- N. bellii × N. merrilliana
- N. merrilliana × N. mindanaoensis
- N. merrilliana × N. mirabilis
