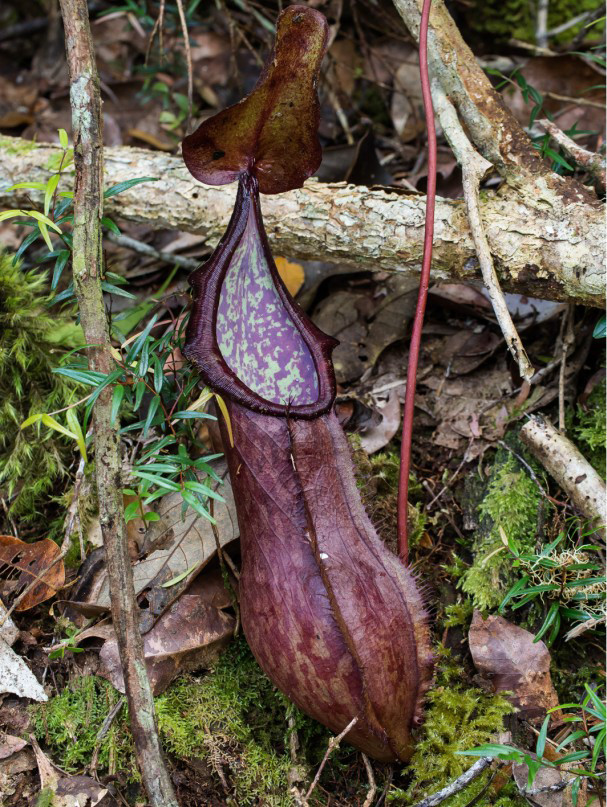

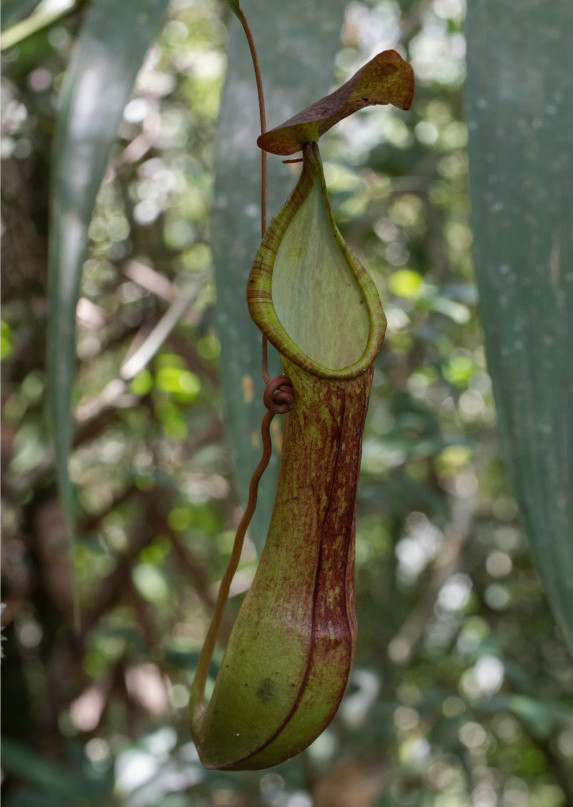
- A lower (top) and upper pitcher from the type locality in the Pantaron range

Scientific classification
- Kingdom: Plantae
- Clade: Embryophytes
- Clade: Tracheophytes
- Clade: Angiosperms
- Clade: Eudicots
- Order: Caryophyllales
- Family: Nepenthaceae
- Genus: Nepenthes
- Species: N. talaandig

Binomial name
- Nepenthes talaandig Gronem., Coritico, Wistuba, Micheler, Marwinski, Gieray & V.B.Amoroso (2014)

= Nepenthes talaandig =

Species of pitcher plant from the Philippines

Nepenthes talaandig is a tropical pitcher plant native to the Philippines. It is known only from the Pantaron Mountain Range of central Mindanao, where it grows terrestrially on ultramafic soils at around 1,000 m above sea level.

The describing authors wrote that, based on its pitcher morphology, N. talaandig "is not directly related to any other Philippine species", though they suggested it might belong to the large "N. alata group". This complex includes N. alata, N. ceciliae, N. copelandii, N. cornuta, N. extincta, N. graciliflora, N. hamiguitanensis, N. kitanglad, N. kurata, N. leyte, N. mindanaoensis, N. negros, N. ramos, N. saranganiensis, and N. ultra. These species are united by a number of morphological characters, including winged petioles, lids with basal ridges on the lower surface (often elaborated into appendages), and upper pitchers that are usually broadest near the base.

The specific epithet talaandig refers to the Talaandig people, on whose ancestral lands in east Bukidnon the species grows.

The discovery and recognition of this taxon as a new species was announced online in September 2012, under the placeholder name "Nepenthes species 3".
