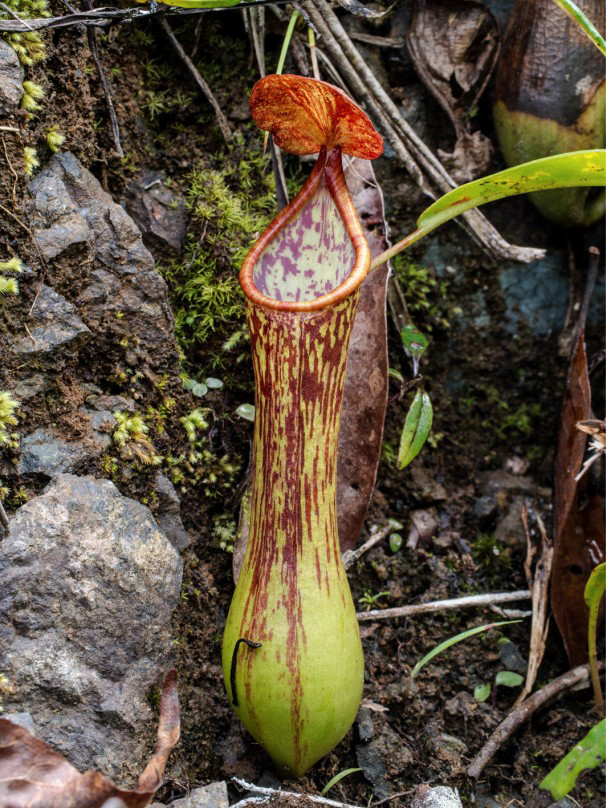
- A lower pitcher at the type locality
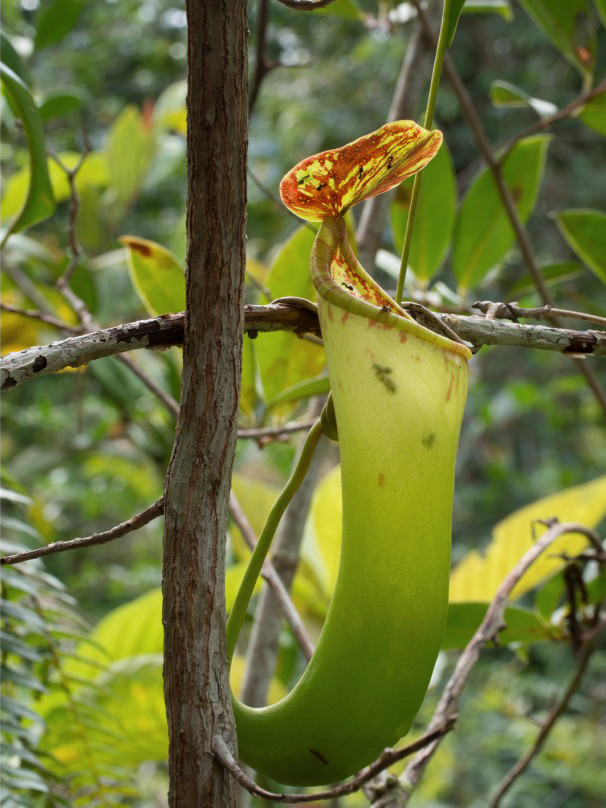
- An upper pitcher colonised by ants of the genus Crematogaster

Scientific classification
- Kingdom: Plantae
- Clade: Tracheophytes
- Clade: Angiosperms
- Clade: Eudicots
- Order: Caryophyllales
- Family: Nepenthaceae
- Genus: Nepenthes
- Species: N. cornuta

Binomial name
- Nepenthes cornuta Marwinski, Coritico, Wistuba, Micheler, Gronem., Gieray & V.B.Amoroso (2014)

= Nepenthes cornuta =

Species of pitcher plant from the Philippines

Nepenthes cornuta is a tropical pitcher plant native to the Philippines. It is known only from the Pantaron Mountain Range of central Mindanao, where it grows terrestrially on ultramafic soils at around 1000 m above sea level.

This species is most closely allied to N. ceciliae and N. copelandii, both also from Mindanao. All three belong to the much larger "N. alata group", which also includes N. alata, N. extincta, N. graciliflora, N. hamiguitanensis, N. kitanglad, N. kurata, N. leyte, N. mindanaoensis, N. negros, N. ramos, N. saranganiensis, and N. ultra. These species are united by a number of morphological characters, including winged petioles, lids with basal ridges on the lower surface (often elaborated into appendages), and upper pitchers that are usually broadest near the base.

The specific epithet cornuta is Latin for "horned" and refers to the shape of the upper pitchers.

The discovery and recognition of this taxon as a new species was announced online in September 2012, under the placeholder name "Nepenthes species 1".
