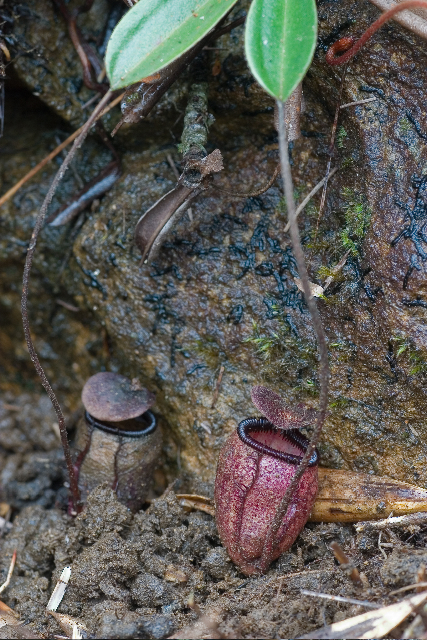
- Nepenthes argentii in habitat. Mount Guiting-Guiting, Sibuyan Island.

Conservation status
- Vulnerable (IUCN 2.3)

Scientific classification
- Kingdom: Plantae
- Clade: Embryophytes
- Clade: Tracheophytes
- Clade: Angiosperms
- Clade: Eudicots
- Order: Caryophyllales
- Family: Nepenthaceae
- Genus: Nepenthes
- Species: N. argentii

Binomial name
- Nepenthes argentii Jebb & Cheek (1997)

= Nepenthes argentii =

Species of pitcher plant from the Philippines

Nepenthes argentii (/nɪˈpɛnθiːz ɑːrˈdʒɛntiaɪ/; after George Argent) is a highland Nepenthes pitcher plant native to Mount Guiting-Guiting on Sibuyan Island in the Philippines. It is possibly the smallest species in the genus and does not appear to have a climbing stage.

== Distribution ==
Nepenthes argentii inhabits subalpine shrubbery "with a smooth wind-clipped canopy 30 cm tall on an ultrabasic ridge". It grows at an elevation of 1,400–1,900 m.

On Mount Guiting-Guiting, N. argentii is sympatric with N. sibuyanensis at around 1,600 to 1,770 m. A taxon resembling N. alata grows on Mount Guiting-Guiting at lower elevations of 800 to 1,000 m; it was described as N. graciliflora by Adolph Daniel Edward Elmer. Other plant species endemic to the mountain include Lobelia proctorii and Rhododendron rousei.

Nepenthes argentii has no known natural hybrids, although it may hybridise with N. sibuyanensis. No forms or varieties have been described.
