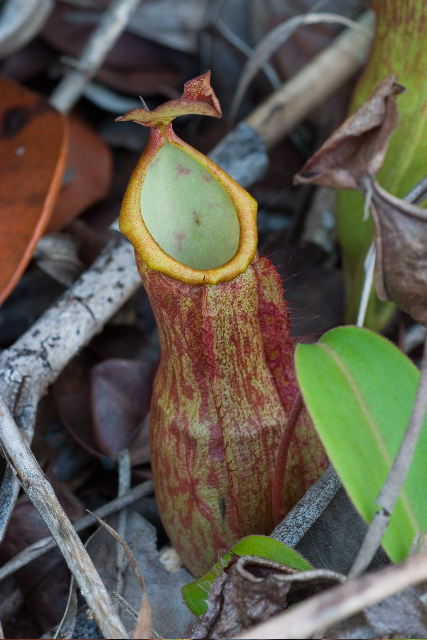
- Lower pitcher of Nepenthes philippinensis growing near its type locality. Bacungan, Palawan.

Conservation status
- Least Concern (IUCN 3.1)

Scientific classification
- Kingdom: Plantae
- Clade: Tracheophytes
- Clade: Angiosperms
- Clade: Eudicots
- Order: Caryophyllales
- Family: Nepenthaceae
- Genus: Nepenthes
- Species: N. philippinensis

Binomial name
- Nepenthes philippinensis Macfarl. (1908)

Synonyms
- Synonyms: Nepenthes alata auct. non Blanco: Danser (1928) [=N. abalata/N. alata/N. benstonei/ N. copelandii/N. eustachya/N. graciliflora/ N. mindanaoensis/N. mirabilis/ N. negros/N. philippinensis]; Nepenthes brachycarpa Merr. (1915); Nepenthes wilkiei Jebb & Cheek (1998)

= Nepenthes philippinensis =

Species of pitcher plant from the Philippines

Nepenthes philippinensis /nɪˈpɛnθiːz fɪˌlɪpɪˈnɛnsɪs/ is a tropical pitcher plant endemic to the Philippines. It is known from Palawan and the neighbouring Calamian Islands (including Busuanga, Coron, and Culion) and Linapacan, where it grows at 0–600 metres (2,000 ft) above sea level.

== Description ==
Nepenthes wilkiei was described by Matthew Jebb and Martin Cheek in 1998. This taxon was subsequently found to be conspecific with N. philippinensis. Jebb and Cheek suggest that N. philippinensis is more closely related to the Bornean species N. hirsuta, N. hispida, and N. macrovulgaris than it is to N. alata.

Nepenthes philippinensis produces the most concurrent inflorescences of any species in the genus; up to 190 have been recorded on a single plant.

== Hybrids ==
Nepenthes philippinensis has no known natural hybrids. No forms or varieties have been formally described, although a multitude of taxa resembling N. philippinensis are found across the isolated peaks of Palawan.
