= Nepenthes blancoi =

Nepenthes blancoi may refer to:

- Nepenthes blancoi Blume (1852) — synonym of N. alata (after neotypification)
- Nepenthes blancoi auct. non Blume: Macfarl. (1908); Macfarl. (1927) — synonym of N. abalata
