= Nepenthes abalata =

Conservation status
- Least Concern (IUCN 3.1)

Scientific classification
- Kingdom: Plantae
- Clade: Tracheophytes
- Clade: Angiosperms
- Clade: Eudicots
- Order: Caryophyllales
- Family: Nepenthaceae
- Genus: Nepenthes
- Species: N. abalata

Binomial name
- Nepenthes abalata Jebb & Cheek (2013)

Synonyms
- Synonyms: Nepenthes alata auct. non Blanco: Danser (1928) [=N. abalata/N. alata/N. benstonei/ N. copelandii/N. eustachya/N. graciliflora/ N. mindanaoensis/N. mirabilis/ N. negros/N. philippinensis]; Nepenthes alata auct. non Blanco: Jebb & Cheek (1997); Cheek & Jebb (2001) [=N. abalata/N. alata]; Nepenthes blancoi auct. non Blume: Macfarl. (1908); Macfarl. (1927)

Species of pitcher plant from the Philippines

Nepenthes abalata is a tropical pitcher plant known from three western islands of the Philippines: Culion, Cuyo, and Malalison. It has been recorded from coastal grassland and scrub at elevations of 0–20 m above sea level.

The specific epithet abalata may be translated as "from alata" and refers to the historical lumping of N. abalata with the widespread and highly variable N. alata.
