= Volker Heinrich =

Volker Bernd Heinrich is a German naturalist.

He studied horticultural sciences at the Technical University of Munich. A self-confessed "nepenthophile", he is a carnivorous plant enthusiast.

== Personal Life and Career ==
Heinrich has settled in the Philippines with his wife and family and operates the largest dedicated carnivorous plant nursery of the Philippines - the Pitcher Plant Farm.

His interest in Nepenthes and his knowledge of possible pitcher plant sites have made him a regular member of expeditions in the country in recent years. He is the co-discoverer and co-describer of several new Nepenthes species, including N. attenboroughii, N. hamiguitanensis, and N. micramphora.
