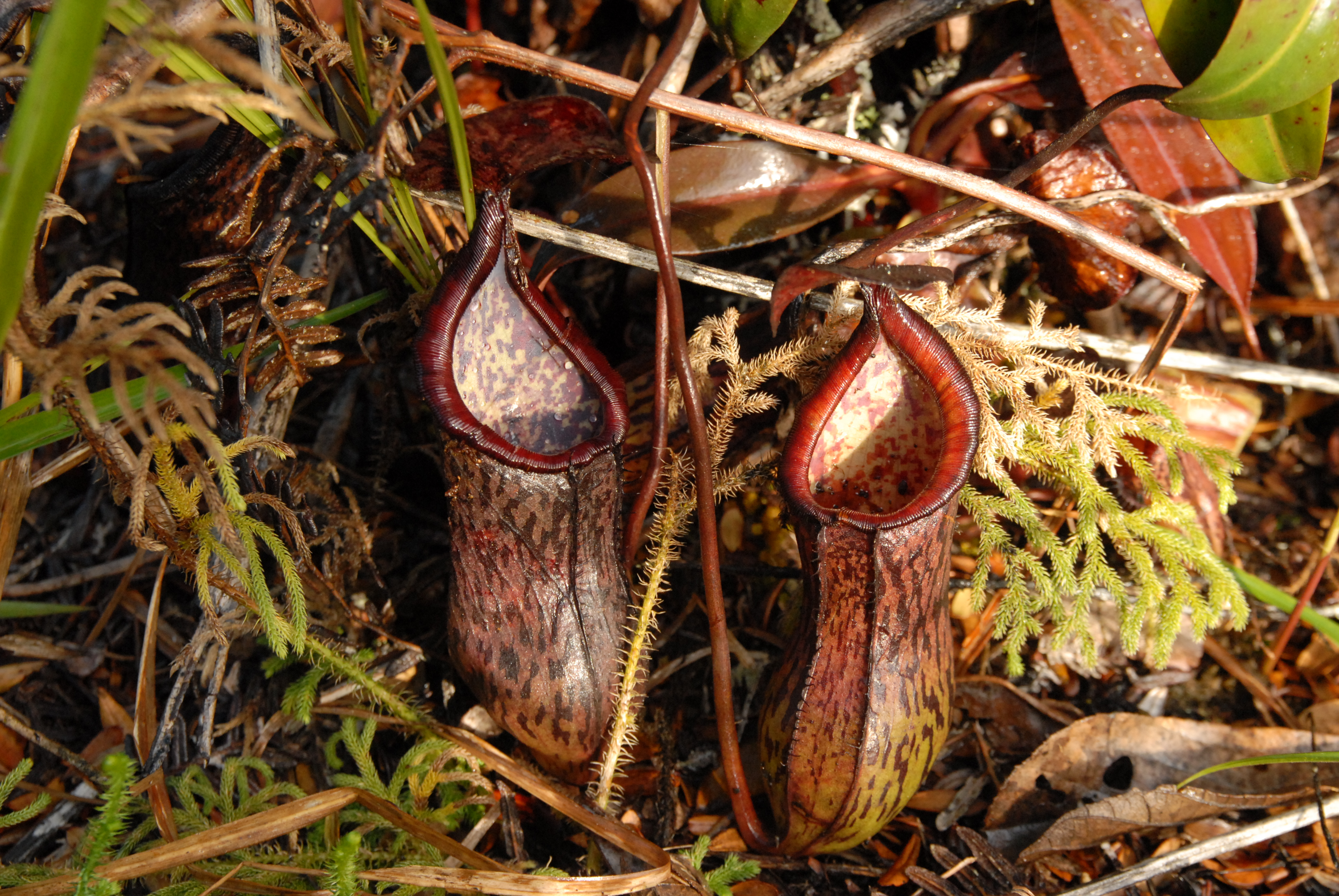

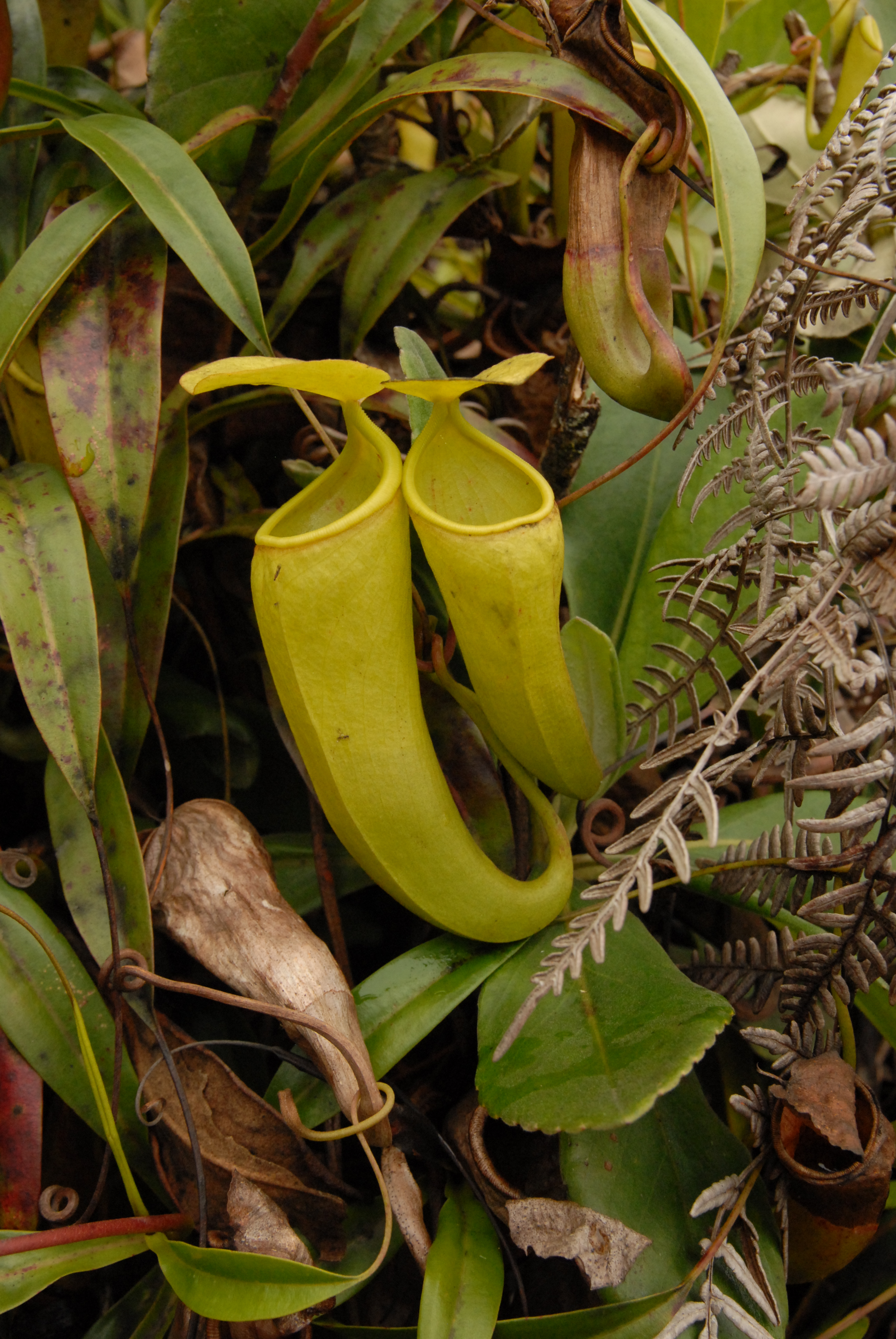
- Lower (top) and upper pitchers from the type locality on Mount Kiamo

Scientific classification
- Kingdom: Plantae
- Clade: Embryophytes
- Clade: Tracheophytes
- Clade: Angiosperms
- Clade: Eudicots
- Order: Caryophyllales
- Family: Nepenthaceae
- Genus: Nepenthes
- Species: N. ceciliae

Binomial name
- Nepenthes ceciliae Gronem., Coritico, Micheler, Marwinski, Acil & V.B.Amoroso (2011)

= Nepenthes ceciliae =

Species of pitcher plant from the Philippines

Nepenthes ceciliae is a tropical pitcher plant endemic to the Philippine island of Mindanao, where it grows at 1500–1880 m above sea level. Its discovery was announced online in August 2011.

Nepenthes ceciliae belongs to the informal "N. alata group", which also includes N. alata, N. copelandii, N. extincta, N. graciliflora, N. hamiguitanensis, N. kitanglad, N. kurata, N. leyte, N. mindanaoensis, N. negros, N. ramos, N. saranganiensis, and N. ultra. These species are united by a number of morphological characters, including winged petioles, lids with basal ridges on the lower surface (often elaborated into appendages), and upper pitchers that are usually broadest near the base. In their original paper defining the N. alata group, Martin Cheek and Matthew Jebb treated N. ceciliae as possibly conspecific with N. copelandii.

== Natural hybrids ==
- N. ceciliae × N. pulchra
