= Nepenthes negros =

Scientific classification
- Kingdom: Plantae
- Clade: Tracheophytes
- Clade: Angiosperms
- Clade: Eudicots
- Order: Caryophyllales
- Family: Nepenthaceae
- Genus: Nepenthes
- Species: N. negros

Binomial name
- Nepenthes negros Jebb & Cheek (2013)

Synonyms
- Synonyms: Nepenthes alata auct. non Blanco: Danser (1928) [=N. abalata/N. alata/N. benstonei/ N. copelandii/N. eustachya/N. graciliflora/ N. mindanaoensis/N. mirabilis/ N. negros/N. philippinensis]; Nepenthes alata var. biflora Macfarl. (1908)

Species of pitcher plant from the Philippines

Nepenthes negros is a tropical pitcher plant native to the Philippines, specifically the islands of Biliran and Negros.

Nepenthes negros belongs to the informal "N. alata group", which also includes N. alata, N. ceciliae, N. copelandii, N. extincta, N. graciliflora, N. hamiguitanensis, N. kitanglad, N. kurata, N. leyte, N. mindanaoensis, N. ramos, N. saranganiensis, and N. ultra. These species are united by a number of morphological characters, including winged petioles, lids with basal ridges on the lower surface (often elaborated into appendages), and upper pitchers that are usually broadest near the base.

It has been suggested that N. negros might fall within the natural variability of N. ramos, though field studies would be needed to confirm this.
