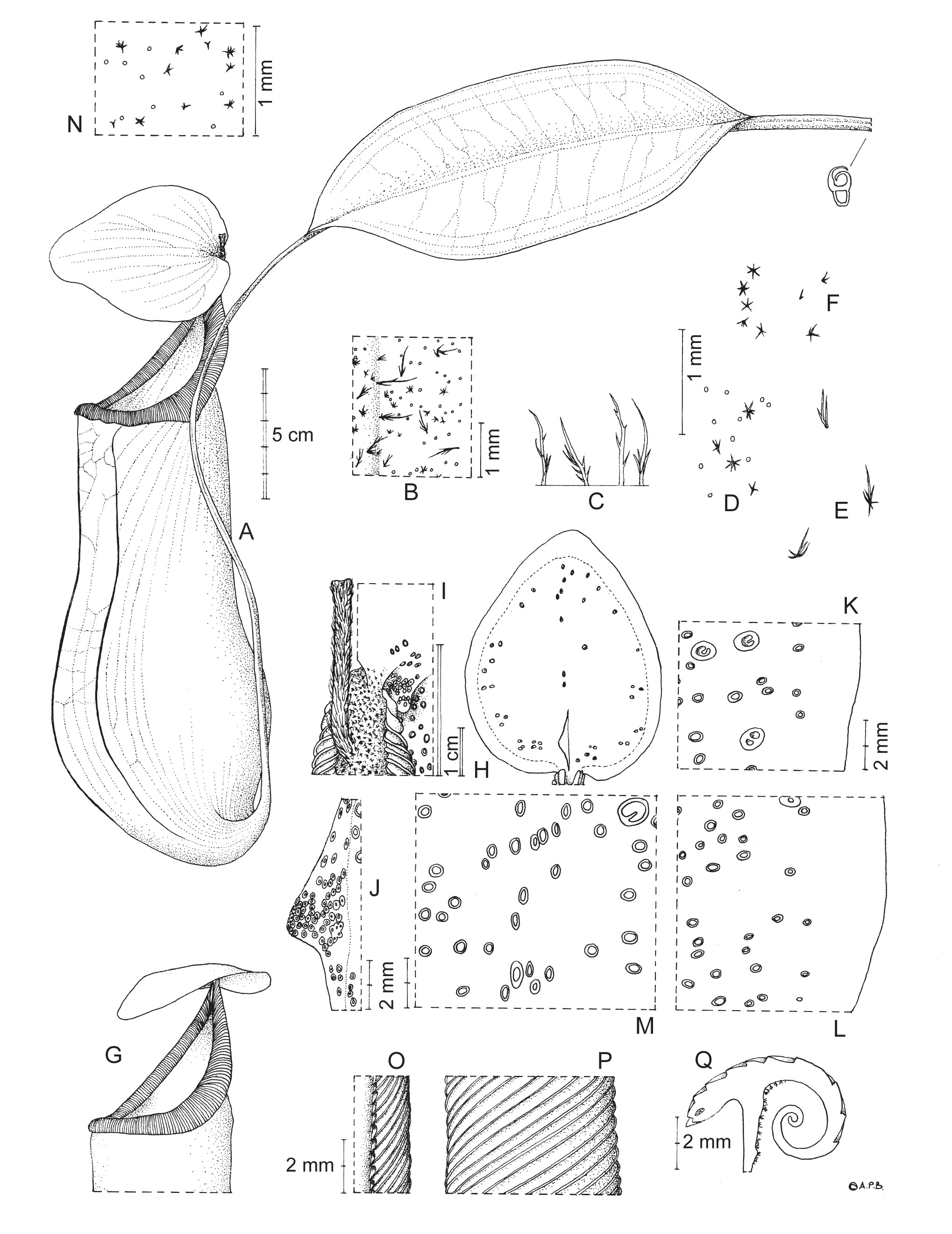
- Botanical illustration of N. extincta from Cheek and Jebb's type description

Scientific classification
- Kingdom: Plantae
- Clade: Embryophytes
- Clade: Tracheophytes
- Clade: Angiosperms
- Clade: Eudicots
- Order: Caryophyllales
- Family: Nepenthaceae
- Genus: Nepenthes
- Species: N. extincta

Binomial name
- Nepenthes extincta Jebb & Cheek (2013)

= Nepenthes extincta =

Species of pitcher plant from the Philippines

Nepenthes extincta is a tropical pitcher plant native to the Philippines. It is known only from Surigao del Sur, Mindanao, where it has been recorded at c. 400 metres (1,300 ft) altitude.

This species belongs to the informal "N. alata group", which also includes N. alata, N. ceciliae, N. copelandii, N. graciliflora, N. hamiguitanensis, N. kitanglad, N. kurata, N. leyte, N. mindanaoensis, N. negros, N. ramos, N. saranganiensis, and N. ultra. These species are united by a number of morphological characters, including winged petioles, lids with basal ridges on the lower surface (often elaborated into appendages), and upper pitchers that are usually broadest near the base.

The specific epithet extincta was chosen to indicate that this species may already be extinct in the wild. Nepenthes extincta is known from a single herbarium specimen collected in 1978.

It has been suggested that the only known specimen of N. extincta might represent a natural hybrid between N. merrilliana and N. mindanaoensis, as both of these species grow near the type locality of N. extincta and share many morphological features with it.
