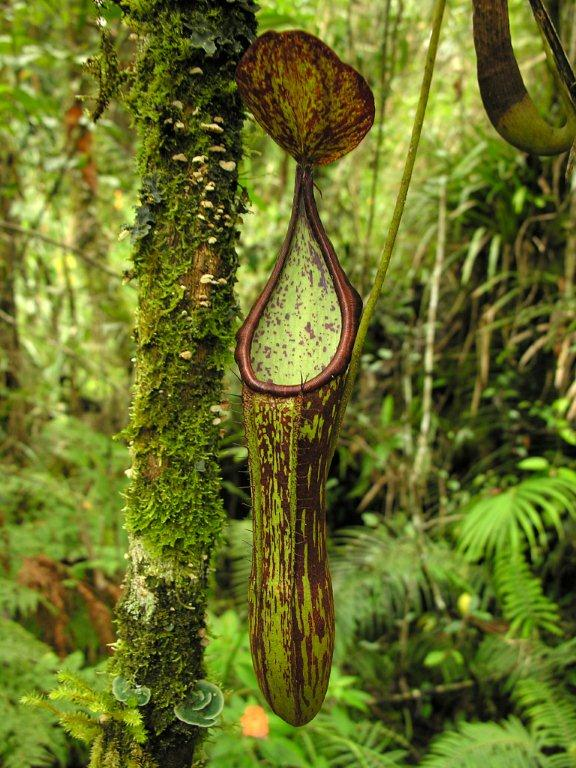
- A hanging lower pitcher of N. copelandii from Mount Apo

Conservation status
- Least Concern (IUCN 3.1)

Scientific classification
- Kingdom: Plantae
- Clade: Embryophytes
- Clade: Tracheophytes
- Clade: Angiosperms
- Clade: Eudicots
- Order: Caryophyllales
- Family: Nepenthaceae
- Genus: Nepenthes
- Species: N. copelandii

Binomial name
- Nepenthes copelandii Merr. ex Macfarl. (1908)

Synonyms
- Synonyms: Nepenthes alata auct. non Blanco: Danser (1928) [=N. abalata/N. alata/N. benstonei/ N. copelandii/N. eustachya/N. graciliflora/ N. mindanaoensis/N. mirabilis/ N. negros/N. philippinensis]

= Nepenthes copelandii =

Species of pitcher plant from the Philippines

Nepenthes copelandii (/nɪˈpɛnθiːz koʊpˈlændiaɪ/; after Edwin Copeland) is a species of pitcher plant native to the island of Mindanao in the Philippines. Originally known from Mount Apo near Davao City and Mount Pasian near Bislig, it has since been discovered on a number of peaks throughout Mindanao. It may also be present on the nearby island of Camiguin. The species has a wide altitudinal distribution of 1100–2400 m above sea level. Nepenthes copelandii has no known natural hybrids. No forms or varieties have been described.

The Mount Apo form has been cultivated by Australian hobbyists since the early 1980s, the taxon being referred to as "N. sp. Philippines No. 2". Plants from Mount Pasian only entered cultivation much later.

Nepenthes copelandii belongs to the informal "N. alata group", which also includes N. alata, N. ceciliae, N. extincta, N. graciliflora, N. hamiguitanensis, N. kitanglad, N. kurata, N. leyte, N. mindanaoensis, N. negros, N. ramos, N. saranganiensis, and N. ultra. These species are united by a number of morphological characters, including winged petioles, lids with basal ridges on the lower surface (often elaborated into appendages), and upper pitchers that are usually broadest near the base.

In his Carnivorous Plant Database, taxonomist Jan Schlauer treats N. copelandii as a heterotypic synonym of N. alata.
