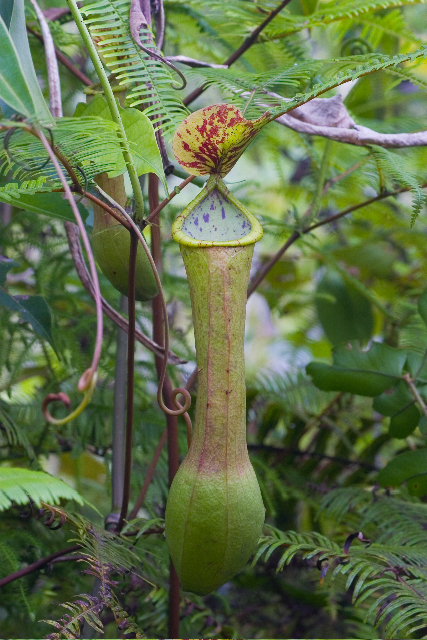
- An upper pitcher of Nepenthes graciliflora on Mount Ayam Bukong, a flank of Mount Halcon, Mindoro

Conservation status
- Least Concern (IUCN 3.1)

Scientific classification
- Kingdom: Plantae
- Clade: Tracheophytes
- Clade: Angiosperms
- Clade: Eudicots
- Order: Caryophyllales
- Family: Nepenthaceae
- Genus: Nepenthes
- Species: N. graciliflora

Binomial name
- Nepenthes graciliflora Elmer (1912)

Synonyms
- Synonyms: Nepenthes alata auct. non Blanco: Danser (1928) [=N. abalata/N. alata/N. benstonei/ N. copelandii/N. eustachya/N. graciliflora/ N. mindanaoensis/N. mirabilis/ N. negros/N. philippinensis]

= Nepenthes graciliflora =

Species of pitcher plant from the Philippines

Nepenthes graciliflora is a tropical pitcher plant endemic to the Philippines. Long considered a synonym of N. alata, it was restored as a separate species in 2013 by Martin Cheek and Matthew Jebb. It has been recorded from the islands of Bohol, Leyte, Luzon, Mindanao, Mindoro, Panay, Samar, and Sibuyan, and following the redelimitation of N. alata is the most widespread Nepenthes species of the Philippines. It is known from mossy, submontane forest, generally at 800–1,280 metres (3,000–4,000 ft) altitude, though the type specimen from Sibuyan was collected at only 300 m (1,000 ft).

Nepenthes graciliflora belongs to the informal "N. alata group", which also includes N. alata, N. ceciliae, N. copelandii, N. extincta, N. hamiguitanensis, N. kitanglad, N. kurata, N. leyte, N. mindanaoensis, N. negros, N. ramos, N. saranganiensis, and N. ultra. These species are united by a number of morphological characters, including winged petioles, lids with basal ridges on the lower surface (often elaborated into appendages), and upper pitchers that are usually broadest near the base.
