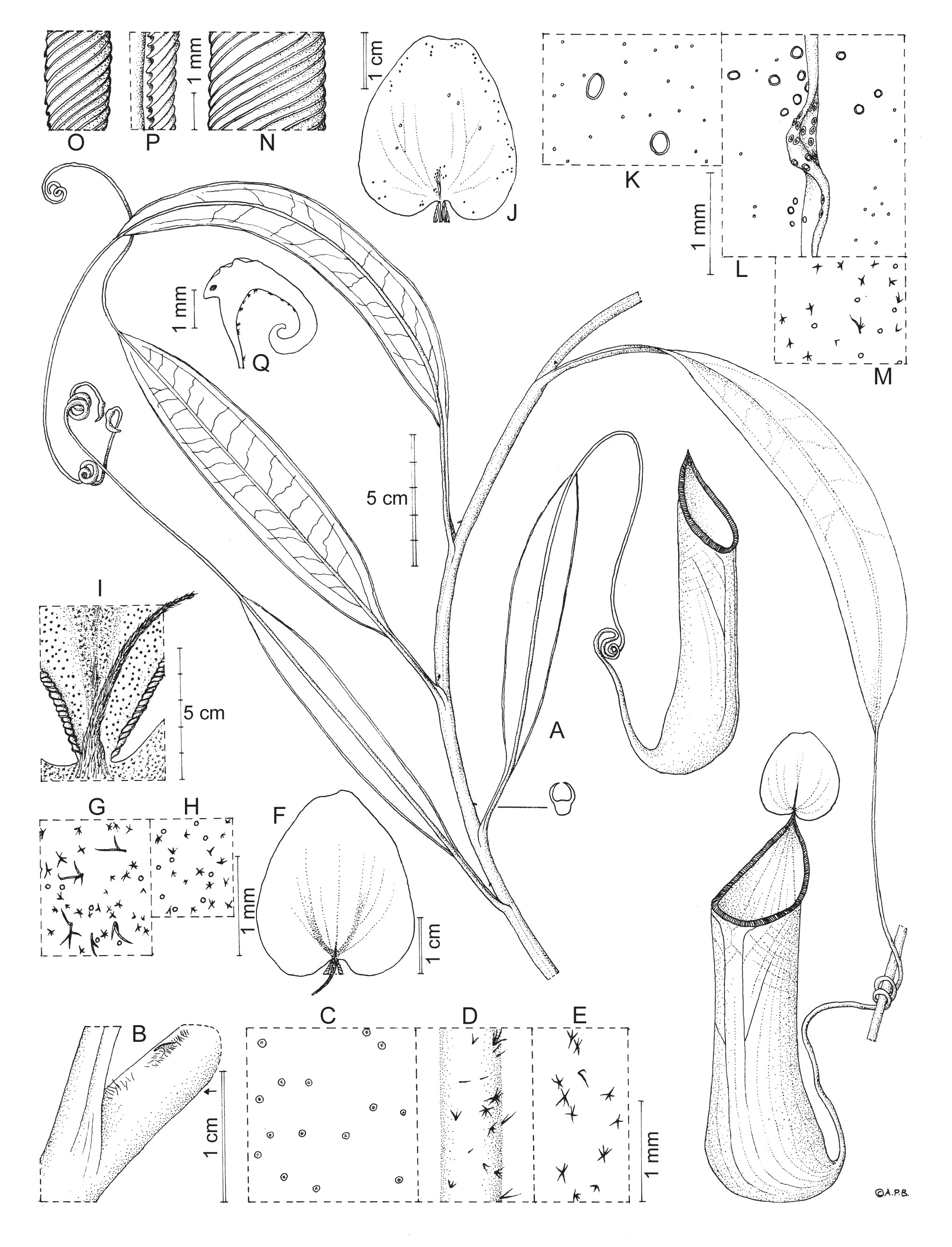
- Botanical illustration of N. leyte from Cheek and Jebb's type description

Scientific classification
- Kingdom: Plantae
- Clade: Embryophytes
- Clade: Tracheophytes
- Clade: Angiosperms
- Clade: Eudicots
- Order: Caryophyllales
- Family: Nepenthaceae
- Genus: Nepenthes
- Species: N. leyte

Binomial name
- Nepenthes leyte Jebb & Cheek (2013)

= Nepenthes leyte =

Species of pitcher plant from the Philippines

Nepenthes leyte is a tropical pitcher plant native to the Philippines. It appears to be endemic to the island of Leyte, after which it is named. It has been recorded from submontane mossy forest at 900 m elevation.

This species belongs to the informal "N. alata group", which also includes N. alata, N. ceciliae, N. copelandii, N. extincta, N. graciliflora, N. hamiguitanensis, N. kitanglad, N. kurata, N. mindanaoensis, N. negros, N. ramos, N. saranganiensis, and N. ultra. These species are united by a number of morphological characters, including winged petioles, lids with basal ridges on the lower surface (often elaborated into appendages), and upper pitchers that are usually broadest near the base.

It has been suggested that N. leyte might fall within the natural variability of N. ramos, though field studies would be needed to confirm this.
