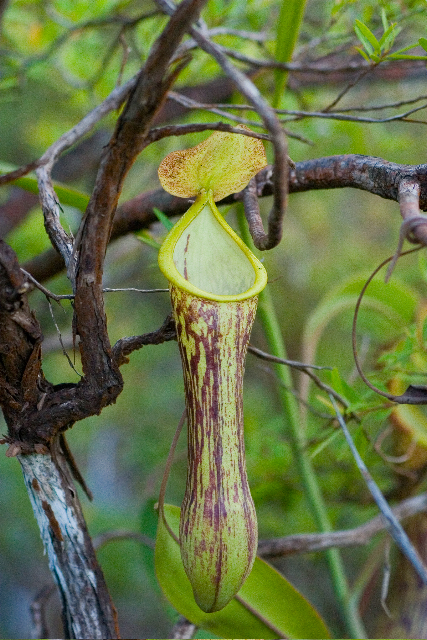
- Nepenthes mindanaoensis. Mount Legaspi, Mindanao, Philippines.

Conservation status
- Least Concern (IUCN 3.1)

Scientific classification
- Kingdom: Plantae
- Clade: Tracheophytes
- Clade: Angiosperms
- Clade: Eudicots
- Order: Caryophyllales
- Family: Nepenthaceae
- Genus: Nepenthes
- Species: N. mindanaoensis

Binomial name
- Nepenthes mindanaoensis Sh.Kurata (2001)

Synonyms
- Synonyms: Nepenthes alata auct. non Blanco: Danser (1928) [=N. abalata/N. alata/N. benstonei/ N. copelandii/N. eustachya/N. graciliflora/ N. mindanaoensis/N. mirabilis/ N. negros/N. philippinensis]; Nepenthes petiolata auct. non Danser: Sh.Kurata & Toyosh. (1966)

= Nepenthes mindanaoensis =

Tropical pitcher plant endemic to the Philippines

Nepenthes mindanaoensis (/nɪˈpɛnθiːz ˌmɪndənaʊˈɛnsɪs/; "from Mindanao") is a tropical pitcher plant native to the Philippine islands of Mindanao and Dinagat.

Nepenthes mindanaoensis belongs to the informal "N. alata group", which also includes N. alata, N. ceciliae, N. copelandii, N. extincta, N. graciliflora, N. hamiguitanensis, N. kitanglad, N. kurata, N. leyte, N. negros, N. ramos, N. saranganiensis, and N. ultra. These species are united by a number of morphological characters, including winged petioles, lids with basal ridges on the lower surface (often elaborated into appendages), and upper pitchers that are usually broadest near the base.

Nepenthes alata var. ecristata—described by John Muirhead Macfarlane in his 1908 monograph, "Nepenthaceae"—was briefly considered a synonym of N. mindanaoensis, then regarded as a species in its own right (N. kurata), before that species was synonymised with N. ramos.

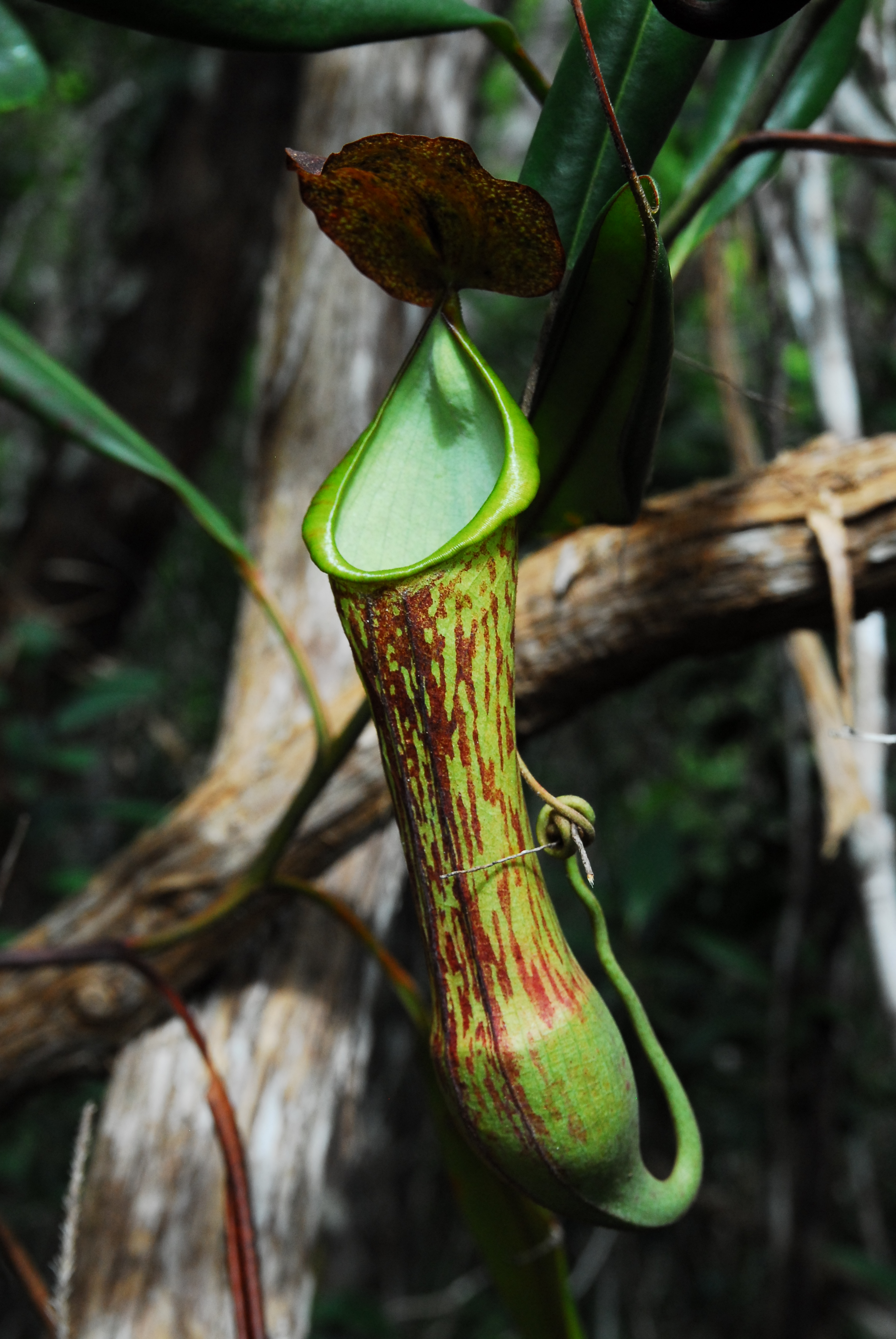
A light-coloured upper pitcher from Dinagat

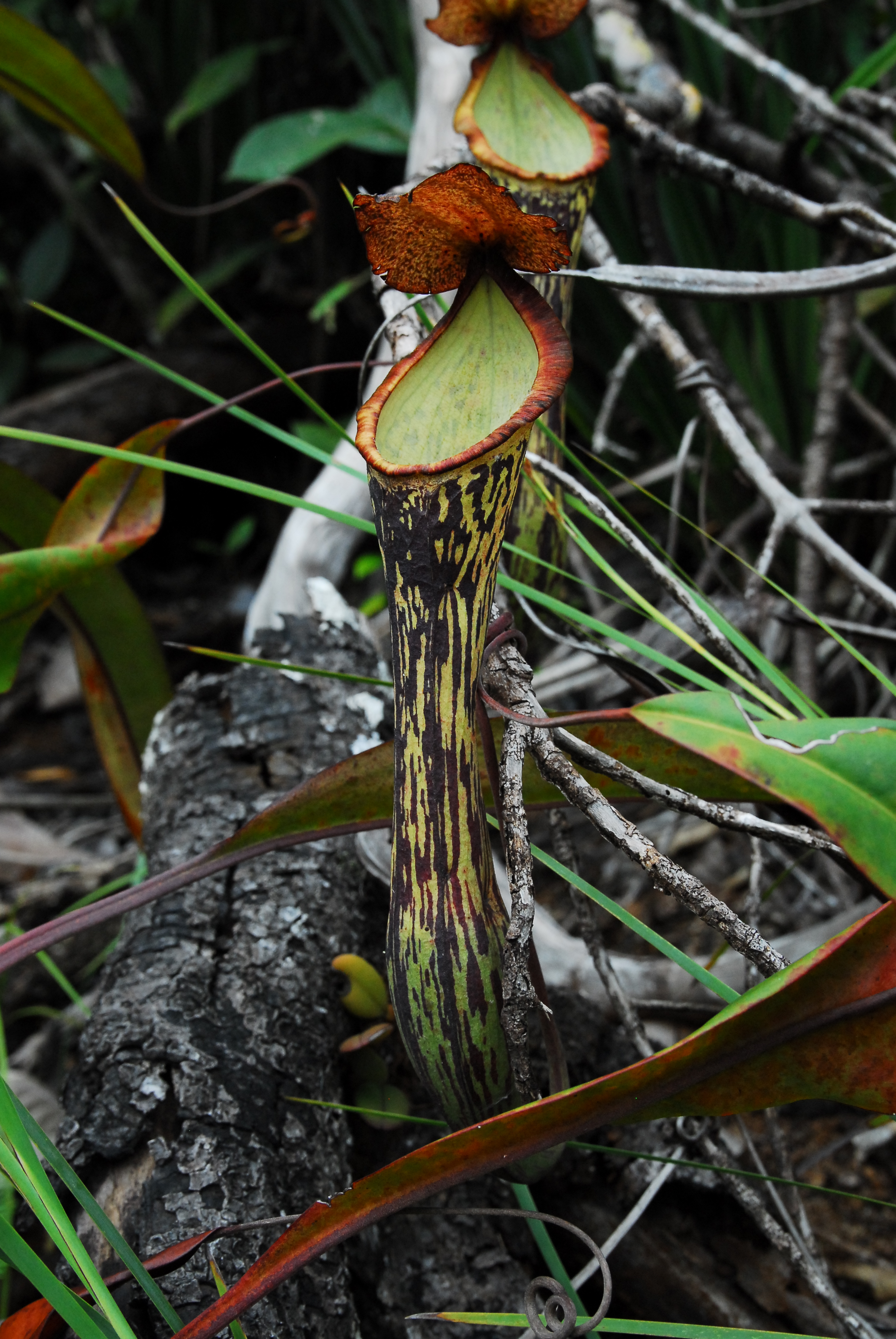
An upper pitcher with darker pigmentation from Dinagat

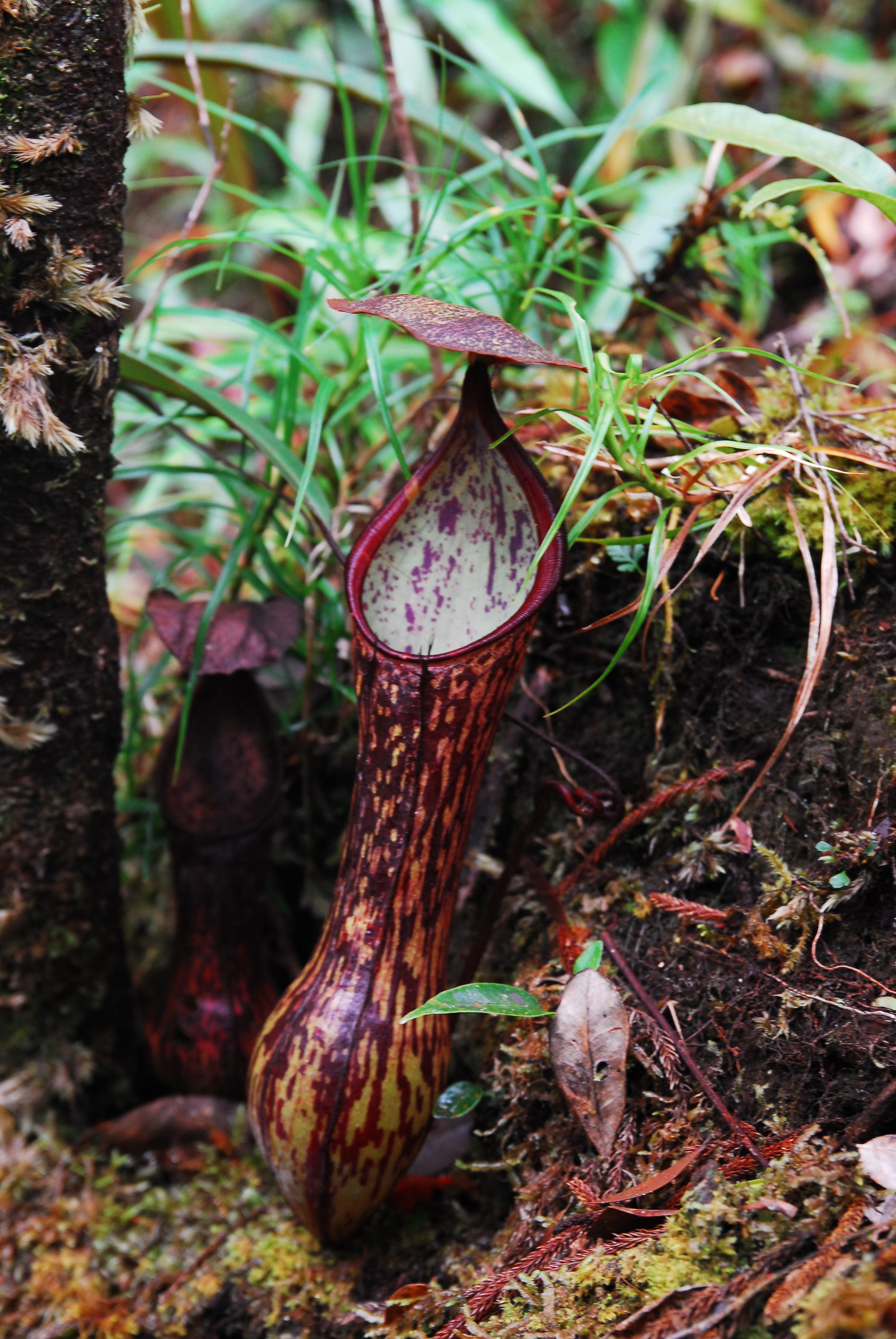
A lower pitcher from Mount Masay, Mindanao

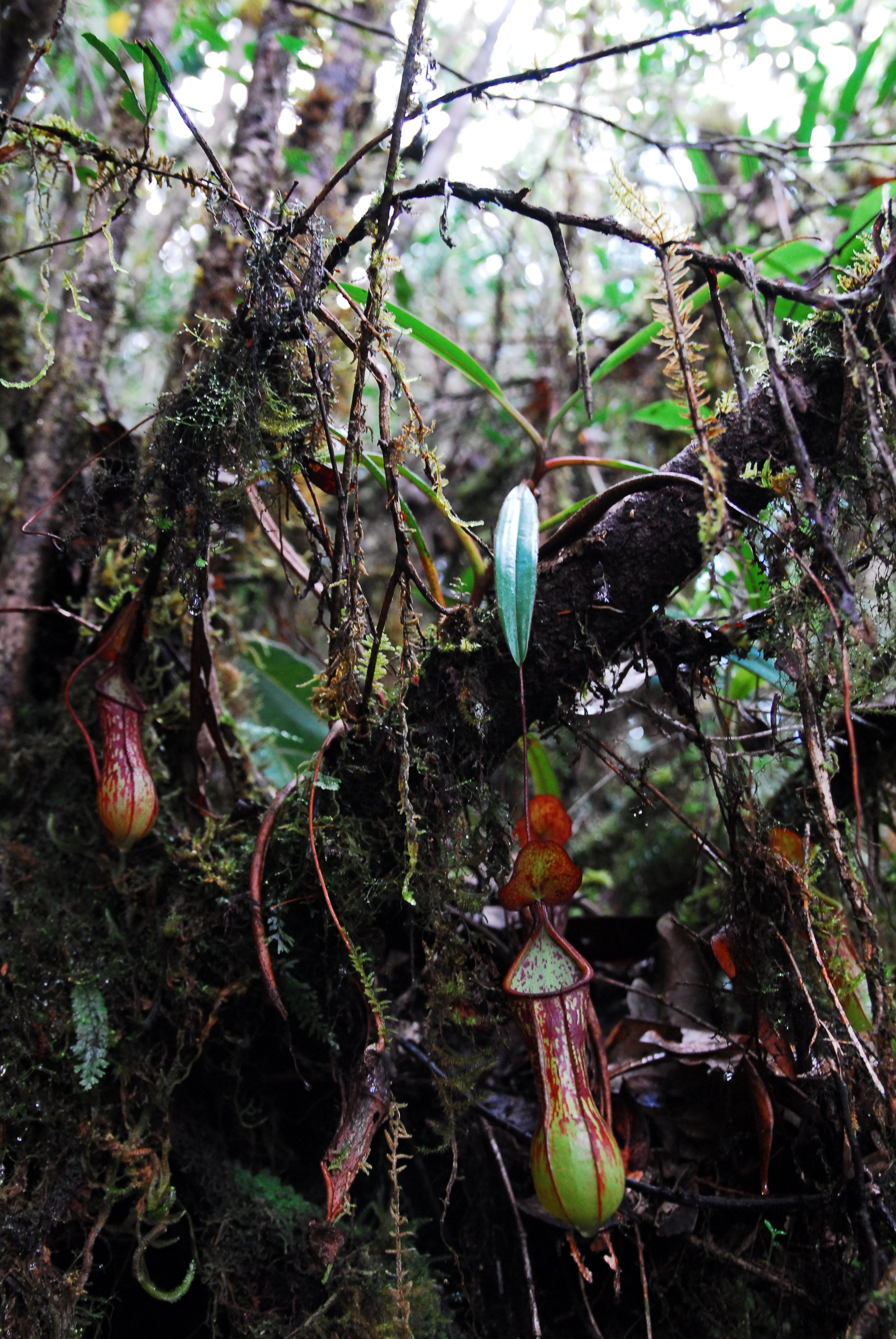
An epiphytic plant from Mount Masay

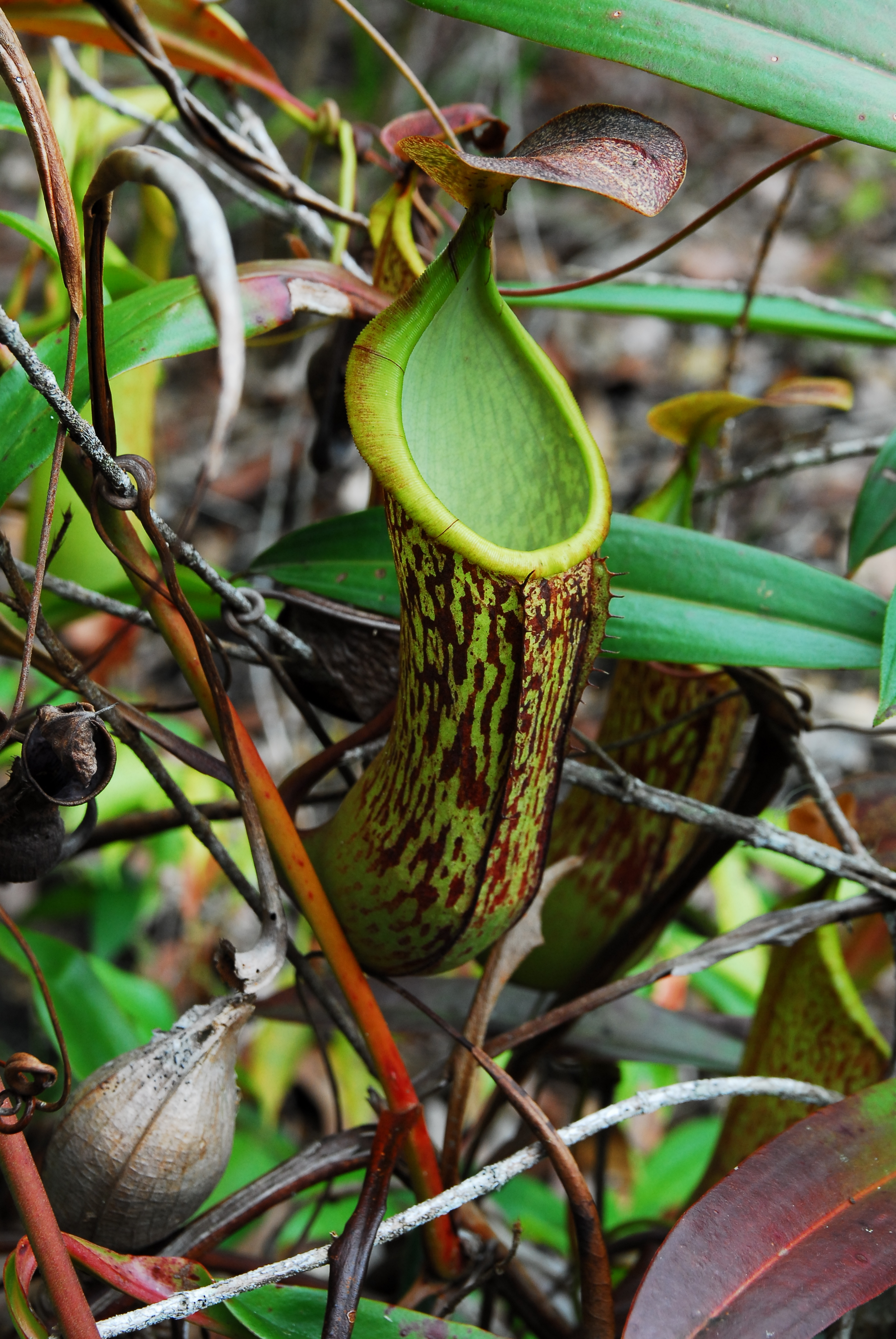
An upper pitcher from Mount Hamiguitan, Mindanao

== Natural hybrids ==
- N. alata × N. mindanaoensis
- N. bellii × N. mindanaoensis
- N. merrilliana × N. mindanaoensis
- N. mindanaoensis × N. truncata
- N. mindananoensis × N. erucoides

Certain plants from Mount Hamiguitan may represent crosses between N. justinae (previously identified as N. mindanaoensis) and N. hamiguitanensis, N. micramphora, and N. peltata.
