= Nepenthes saranganiensis =

Scientific classification
- Kingdom: Plantae
- Clade: Embryophytes
- Clade: Tracheophytes
- Clade: Angiosperms
- Clade: Eudicots
- Order: Caryophyllales
- Family: Nepenthaceae
- Genus: Nepenthes
- Species: N. saranganiensis

Binomial name
- Nepenthes saranganiensis Sh.Kurata (2003)

Species of pitcher plant from the Philippines

Nepenthes saranganiensis (/nɪˈpɛnθiːz sɑːrɑːŋˌɡɑːniˈɛnsɪs/; "from Sarangani") is a tropical pitcher plant native to the Philippine island of Mindanao. It is noted for its extremely decurrent leaf attachment that extends a large distance down the stem, often continuing into the next internode.

Nepenthes saranganiensis belongs to the informal "N. alata group", which also includes N. alata, N. ceciliae, N. copelandii, N. extincta, N. graciliflora, N. hamiguitanensis, N. kitanglad, N. kurata, N. leyte, N. mindanaoensis, N. negros, N. ramos, and N. ultra. These species are united by a number of morphological characters, including winged petioles, lids with basal ridges on the lower surface (often elaborated into appendages), and upper pitchers that are usually broadest near the base.

The species has no known natural hybrids. No forms or varieties have been described.
