= Nepenthes ultra =

Scientific classification
- Kingdom: Plantae
- Clade: Embryophytes
- Clade: Tracheophytes
- Clade: Angiosperms
- Clade: Eudicots
- Order: Caryophyllales
- Family: Nepenthaceae
- Genus: Nepenthes
- Species: N. ultra

Binomial name
- Nepenthes ultra Jebb & Cheek (2013)

Species of pitcher plant from Luzon

Nepenthes ultra is a tropical pitcher plant native to the Philippine island of Luzon, where it grows at low altitude on ultramafic soils (hence the name).

Nepenthes ultra belongs to the informal "N. alata group", which also includes N. alata, N. ceciliae, N. copelandii, N. extincta, N. graciliflora, N. hamiguitanensis, N. kitanglad, N. kurata, N. leyte, N. mindanaoensis, N. negros, N. ramos, and N. saranganiensis. These species are united by a number of morphological characters, including winged petioles, lids with basal ridges on the lower surface (often elaborated into appendages), and upper pitchers that are usually broadest near the base.
