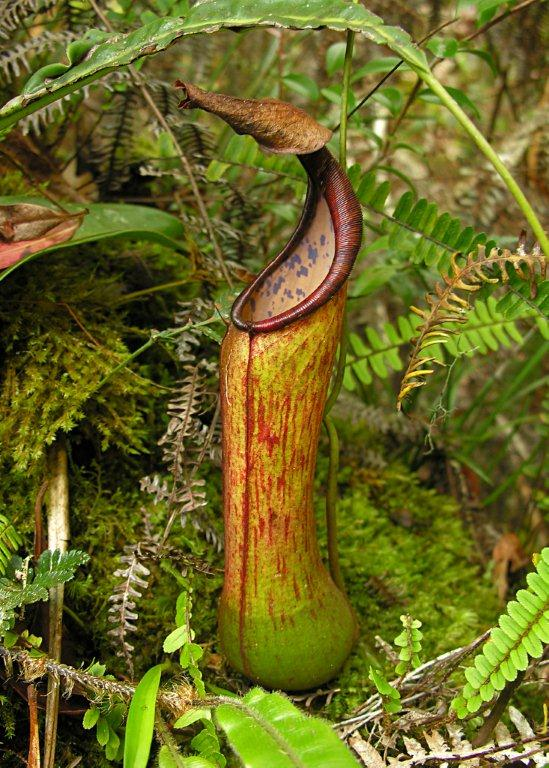
- An upper pitcher of N. kitanglad in habitat
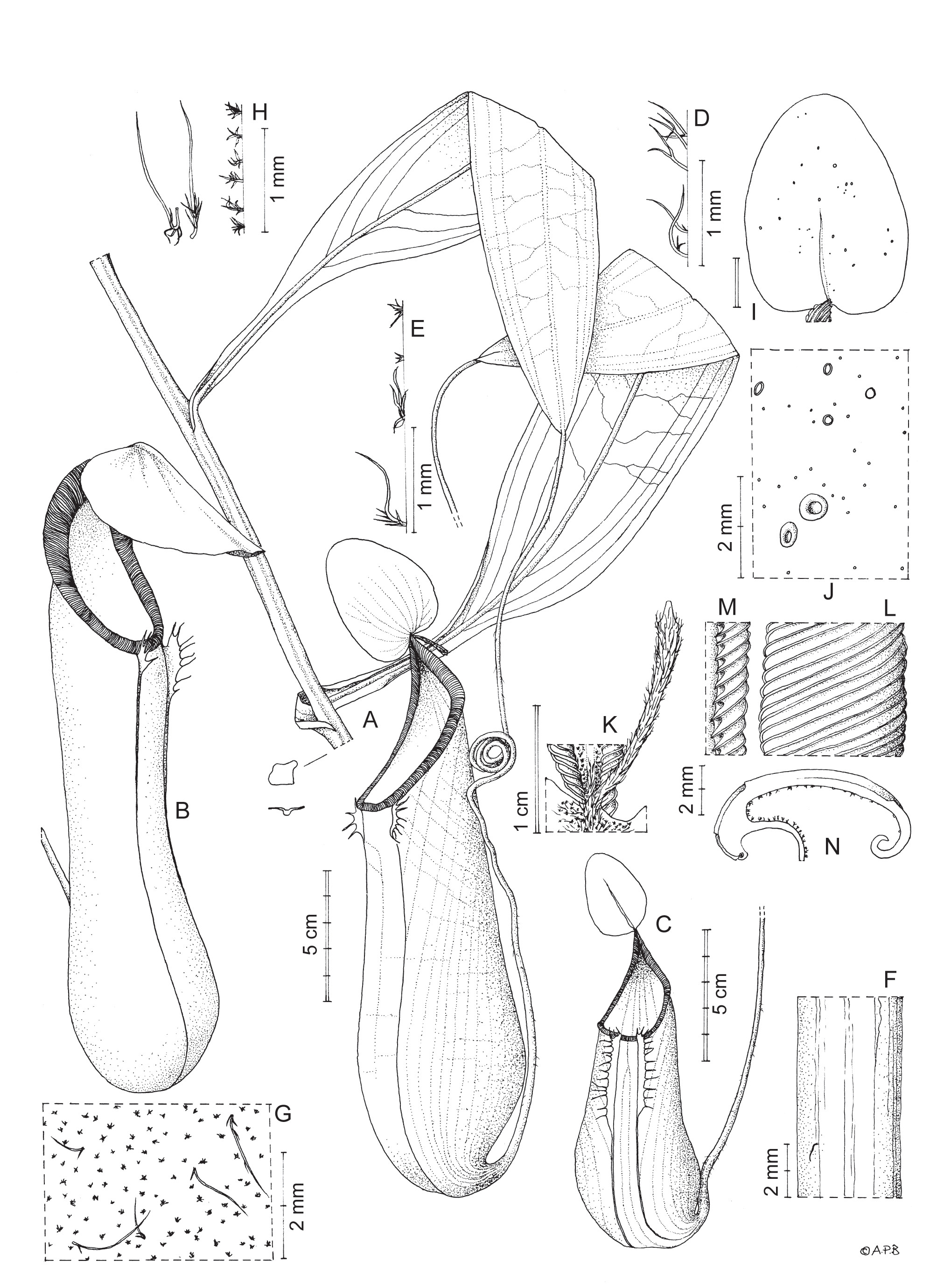
- Botanical illustration of N. kitanglad from Cheek and Jebb's type description

Scientific classification
- Kingdom: Plantae
- Clade: Embryophytes
- Clade: Tracheophytes
- Clade: Angiosperms
- Clade: Eudicots
- Order: Caryophyllales
- Family: Nepenthaceae
- Genus: Nepenthes
- Species: N. kitanglad

Binomial name
- Nepenthes kitanglad Jebb & Cheek (2013)

= Nepenthes kitanglad =

Species of pitcher plant from the Philippines

Nepenthes kitanglad is a tropical pitcher plant native to the Philippines. It is known only from Mount Kitanglad in Bukidnon Province, Mindanao, where it has been recorded as an epiphyte in mossy forest at 1,800–2,100 m altitude. This species belongs to the informal "N. alata group", which also includes N. alata, N. ceciliae, N. copelandii, N. extincta, N. graciliflora, N. hamiguitanensis, N. kurata, N. leyte, N. mindanaoensis, N. negros, N. ramos, N. saranganiensis, and N. ultra. These species are united by a number of morphological characters, including winged petioles, lids with basal ridges on the lower surface (often elaborated into appendages), and upper pitchers that are usually broadest near the base.

Nepenthes kitanglad was illustrated in the second volume of Stewart McPherson's 2009 work, Pitcher Plants of the Old World, where it was tentatively identified as N. saranganiensis. The specific epithet kitanglad refers to Mount Kitanglad, the only known locality of this species.
