= Martin Cheek =

British botanist

Martin Roy Cheek
- Born: 1960 (age 65–66)
- Education: University of Reading; University of Oxford
- Known for: Discovery and description of new plant species
- Scientific career
- Fields: Botany, Taxonomy
- Workplaces: Royal Botanic Gardens, Kew
- Author abbrev. (botany): Cheek

Martin Roy Cheek (born 1960) is a botanist and taxonomist at the Royal Botanic Gardens, Kew.

Cheek attended the University of Reading, graduating with a B.Sc. in 1981 and a M.Sc. in 1983. He earned his DPhil at the University of Oxford in 1989.

== Research ==
With Matthew Jebb, Cheek revised the pitcher plant genus Nepenthes in two major monographs: a skeletal revision in 1997 and a more in-depth treatment of the Malesian species for Flora Malesiana in 2001.

In these and other works, Cheek has described a number of species new to science, often in collaboration with Jebb. These include: N. abalata, N. abgracilis, N. alzapan, N. argentii, N. aristolochioides, N. cid, N. danseri, N. diatas, N. extincta, N. hurrelliana, N. kitanglad, N. kurata, N. lamii, N. leyte, N. mira, N. murudensis, N. negros, N. ramos, N. robcantleyi, N. samar, N. thai, and N. ultra. Cheek and Jebb also raised N. macrophylla to species rank.

Cheek and his research are featured in the documentary The Mists of Mwanenguba.
