= Nepenthaceae (1908 monograph) =

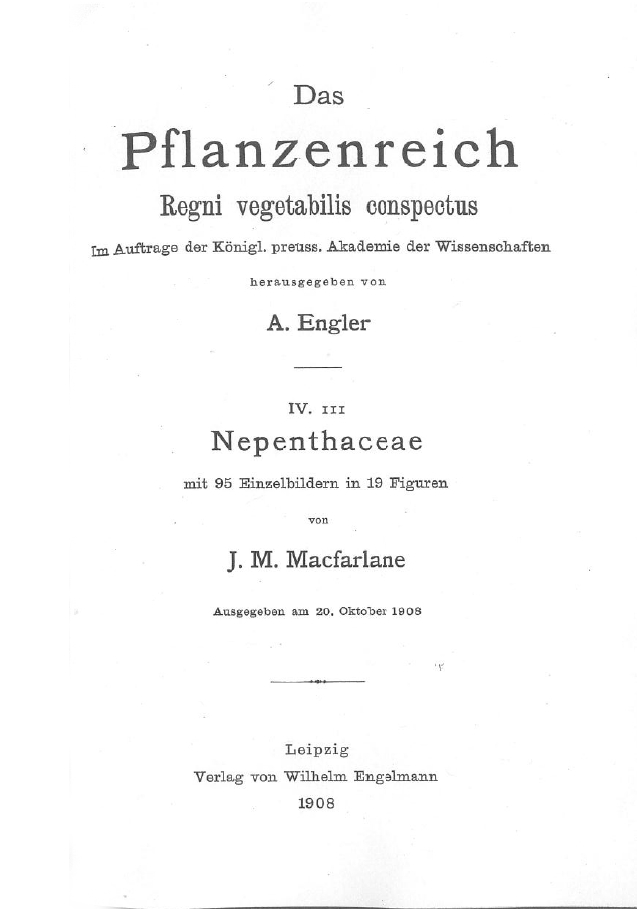
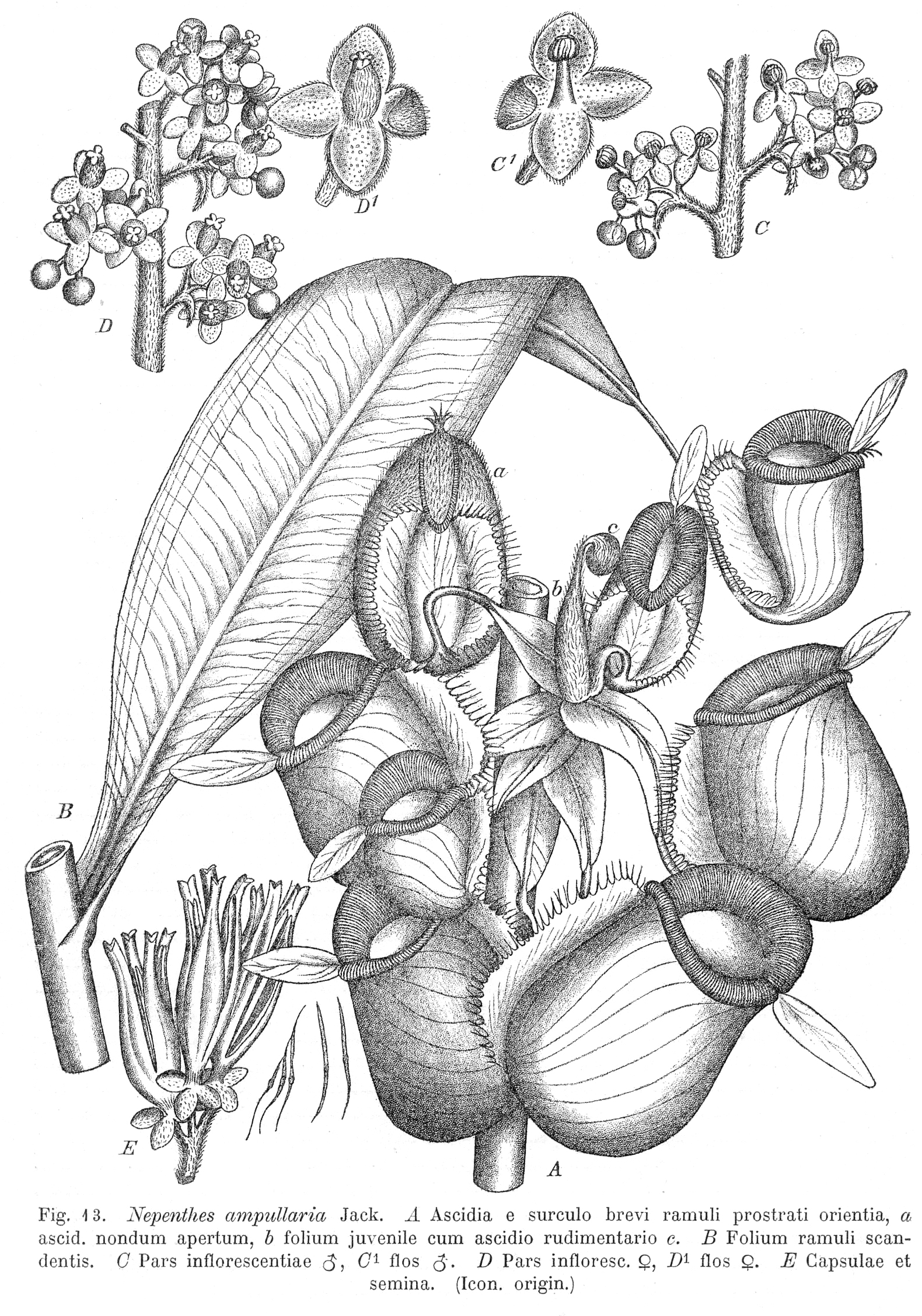
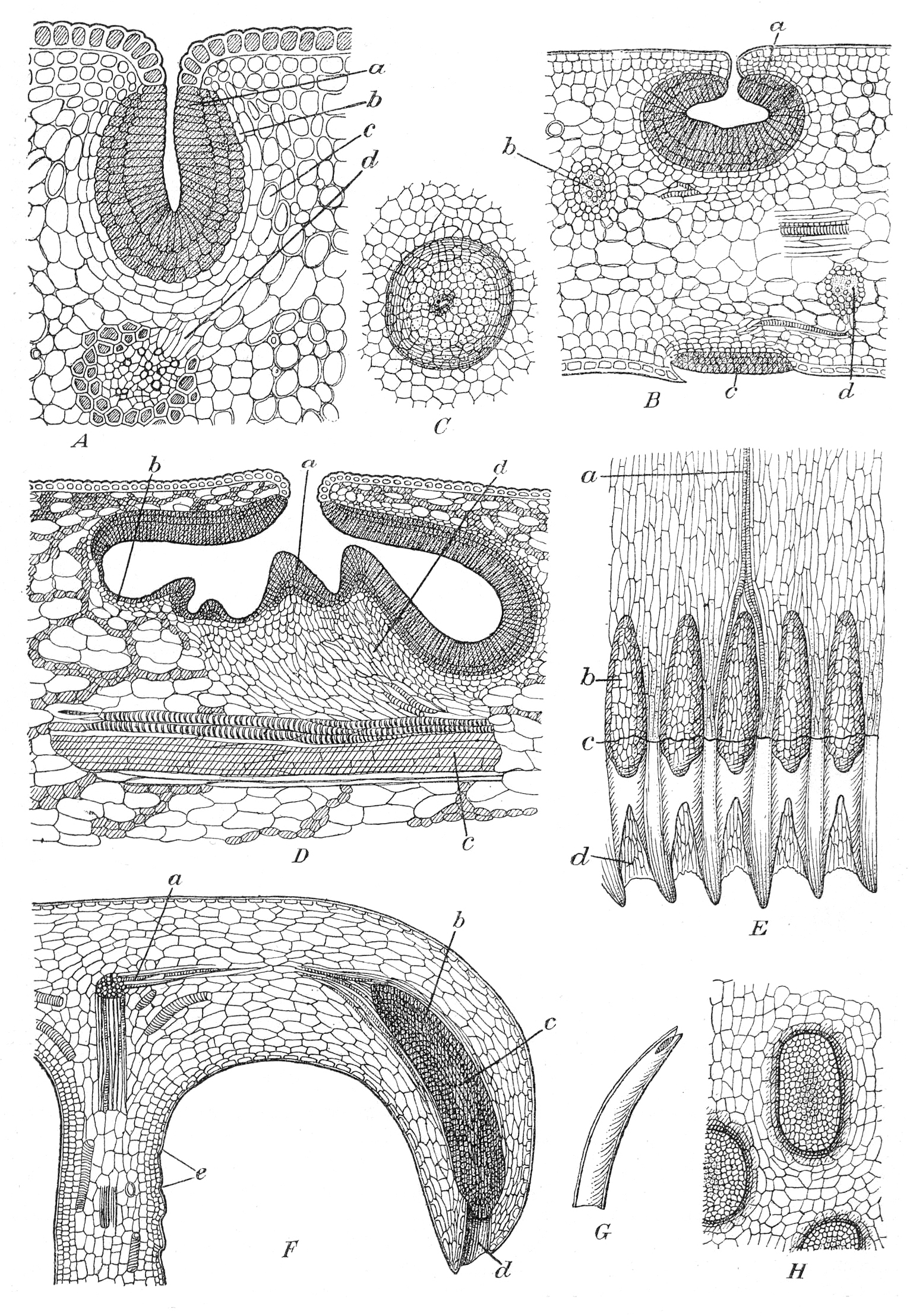
Front cover (left) and two representative figures from Macfarlane's monograph. The one in the centre shows vegetative and floral parts of N. ampullaria; the one on the right illustrates various glandular structures.

"Nepenthaceae" is a monograph by John Muirhead Macfarlane on the tropical pitcher plants of the genus Nepenthes. It was published in 1908 in Adolf Engler's Das Pflanzenreich. It was the most exhaustive revision of the genus up to that point, covering all known species, and included detailed accounts of the structure, anatomy, and development of Nepenthes.

== Content ==
Macfarlane recognised 58 species, including 8 newly described ones: N. anamensis (later synonymised with N. smilesii), N. beccariana, N. copelandii, N. deaniana, N. hemsleyana, N. neglecta (possibly the natural hybrid between N. gracilis and N. mirabilis), N. philippinensis, and N. tubulosa (later synonymised with N. mirabilis). Macfarlane also described a number of new varieties, including N. alata var. biflora (later synonymised with N. negros), N. alata var. ecristata (later synonymised with N. kurata), N. albomarginata var. rubra, N. hirsuta var. glabrata, N. hirsuta var. typica, N. tentaculata var. tomentosa, and N. vieillardii var. montrouzieri. The varietal name N. gracilis var. arenaria, originating from a herbarium sheet, also appeared in print for the first time in Macfarlane's monograph. The work included all manmade hybrids known at the time.

Macfarlane synonymised a number of species, including N. korthalsiana with N. gracilis, N. macrostachya with N. mirabilis, N. sumatrana with N. treubiana (later reversed), and both N. teysmanniana and N. tomentella with N. albomarginata. Macfarlane restored N. edwardsiana as a species distinct from N. villosa. This decision was reversed by B. H. Danser in his 1928 work, "The Nepenthaceae of the Netherlands Indies", but is universally accepted today.

Macfarlane recognised N. × cincta as a natural hybrid between N. albomarginata and N. northiana, and N. × harryana as a natural hybrid between N. edwardsiana and N. villosa.

=== Species ===
The following 58 taxa are enumerated and detailed in Macfarlane's "Nepenthaceae". Varieties recognised by Macfarlane are also included. Taxon names are listed as they appear in the monograph, including orthographic variants, though specific epithets derived from proper nouns have been decapitalised.

1. N. alata
  1. var. biflora
  2. var. ecristata
2. N. albo-lineata
3. N. albo-marginata
  1. var. rubra
  2. var. villosa
4. N. alicae
5. N. ampullaria
  1. var. geelvinkiana
  2. var. longicarpa
6. N. anamensis
7. N. angustifolia
8. N. armbrustae
9. N. beccariana
10. N. bernaysii
11. N. bicalcarata
12. N. blancoi
13. N. bongso
14. N. boschiana
15. N. burbidgei [sic]
16. N. burkei
  1. var. excellens
  2. var. prolifica
17. N. cholmondeleyi
18. N. copelandii
19. N. deaniana
20. N. distillatoria
21. N. echinostoma
22. N. edwardsiana
23. N. eustachya
24. N. garrawayae
25. N. gracilis
26. N. hemsleyana
27. N. hirsuta
  1. var. glabrata
  2. var. typica
28. N. hookeriana
29. N. jardinei
30. N. kennedyana
31. N. khasiana
32. N. lowii
33. N. macfarlanei
34. N. madagascariensis
35. N. maxima
36. N. melamphora
  1. var. haematamphora
  2. var. tomentella
37. N. moorei
38. N. neglecta
39. N. northiana
40. N. pervillei
41. N. philippinensis
42. N. phyllamphora
43. N. rafflesiana
  1. var. minor
  2. var. nigro-purpurea
  3. var. nivea
44. N. rajah
45. N. reinwardtiana
46. N. rowanae
47. N. sanguinea
48. N. singalana
49. N. smilesii
50. N. stenophylla
51. N. tentaculata
  1. var. imberbis
  2. var. tomentosa
52. N. treubiana
53. N. trichocarpa
54. N. tubulosa
55. N. veitchii
56. N. ventricosa
57. N. vieillardii
  1. var. deplanchei
  2. var. montrouzieri
58. N. villosa

Nomina nuda v. incerta

1. N. cristata
2. N. lindleyana

In addition, Macfarlane lists N. gracillima as a possible synonym of N. albomarginata; the species are numbered 7* and 7, respectively.

== Reviews and later works ==
At the time of its publication, "Nepenthaceae" was praised for its many high quality illustrations (95 images in 19 figures) of both morphological and anatomical features.

Research conducted after World War I quickly rendered Macfarlane's monograph outdated. Much additional herbarium material was accumulated during this time, representing both new species and better specimens of known taxa, which highlighted issues with previous interpretations. The need for a new revision of the genus was satisfied with the publication of B. H. Danser's seminal 1928 monograph, "The Nepenthaceae of the Netherlands Indies". However, Danser's treatment did not encompass the entire range of the genus. It would not be until Matthew Jebb and Martin Cheek's 1997 monograph, "A skeletal revision of Nepenthes (Nepenthaceae)", that the entire genus was once again revised in a single work.
