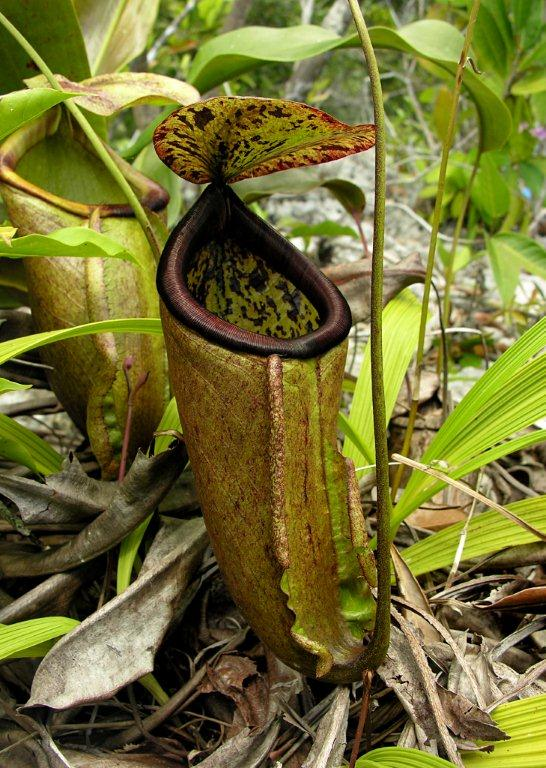
- A lower pitcher of N. treubiana from the McCluer Gulf, New Guinea

Conservation status
- Least Concern (IUCN 3.1)

Scientific classification
- Kingdom: Plantae
- Clade: Tracheophytes
- Clade: Angiosperms
- Clade: Eudicots
- Order: Caryophyllales
- Family: Nepenthaceae
- Genus: Nepenthes
- Species: N. treubiana

Binomial name
- Nepenthes treubiana Warb. (1891)

Synonyms
- Heterochresonyms: Nepenthes treubiana auct. non Warb.: Macfarl. in Engl. (1908); Danser (1928) [=N. sumatrana/N. treubiana]

= Nepenthes treubiana =

Species of pitcher plant from New Guinea

Nepenthes treubiana (/nɪˈpɛnθiːz trɔɪbiˈɑːnə/; after Melchior Treub) is a tropical pitcher plant native to Western New Guinea and the island of Misool (including a number of smaller islands).

This species occurs on the cliffs of the McCluer Gulf and in coastal regions of the Fakfak peninsula. Large subpopulations are now confirmed on Misool. Geographer Stewart McPherson had been unable to find any plants during a prior trip to the island (although he did find N. sp. Misool).

Nepenthes treubiana has no known natural hybrids. No forms or varieties have been described.
