= John Muirhead Macfarlane =

British botanist (1855–1943)

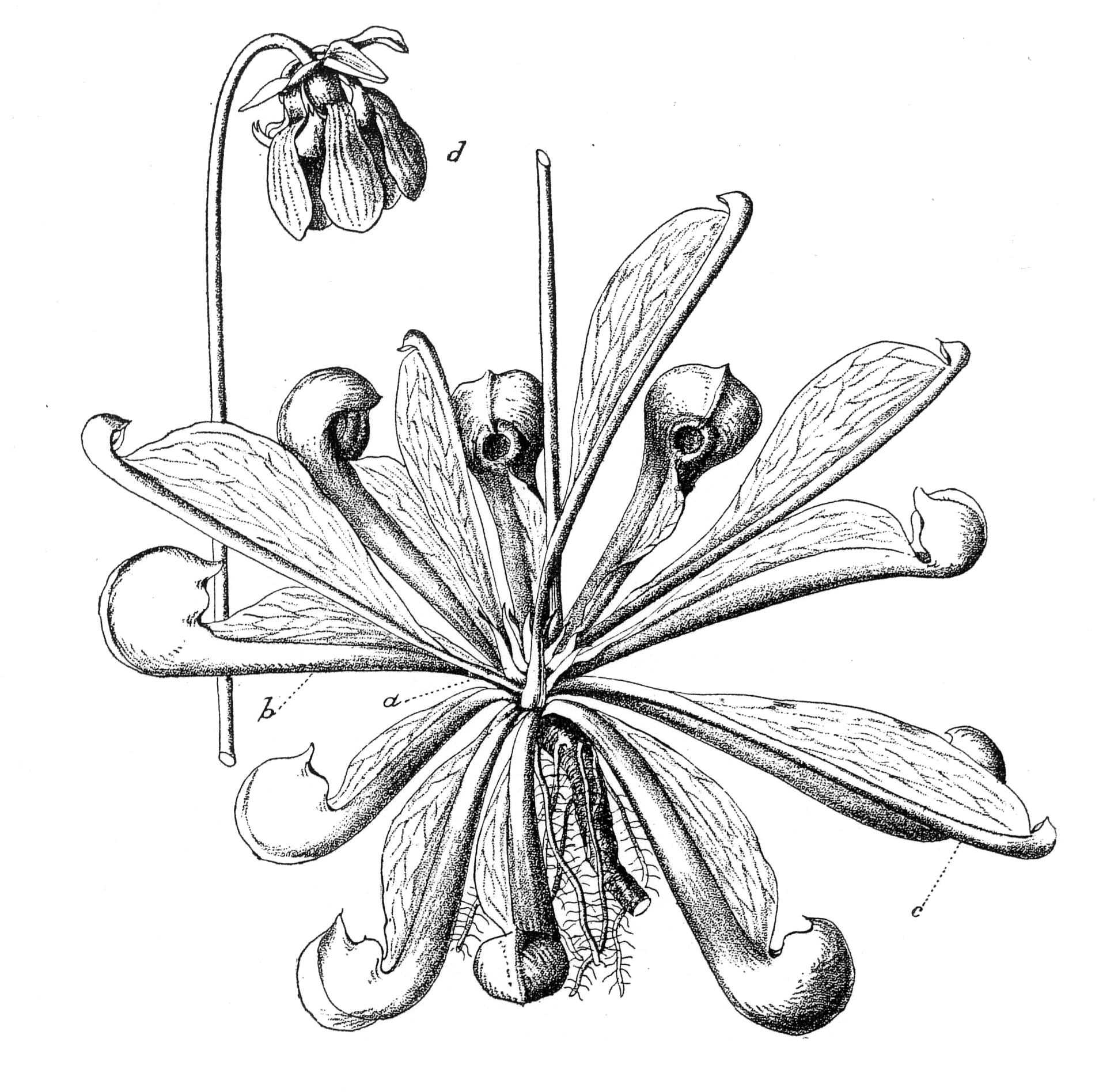
Sarracenia psittacina - Macfarlane illustration

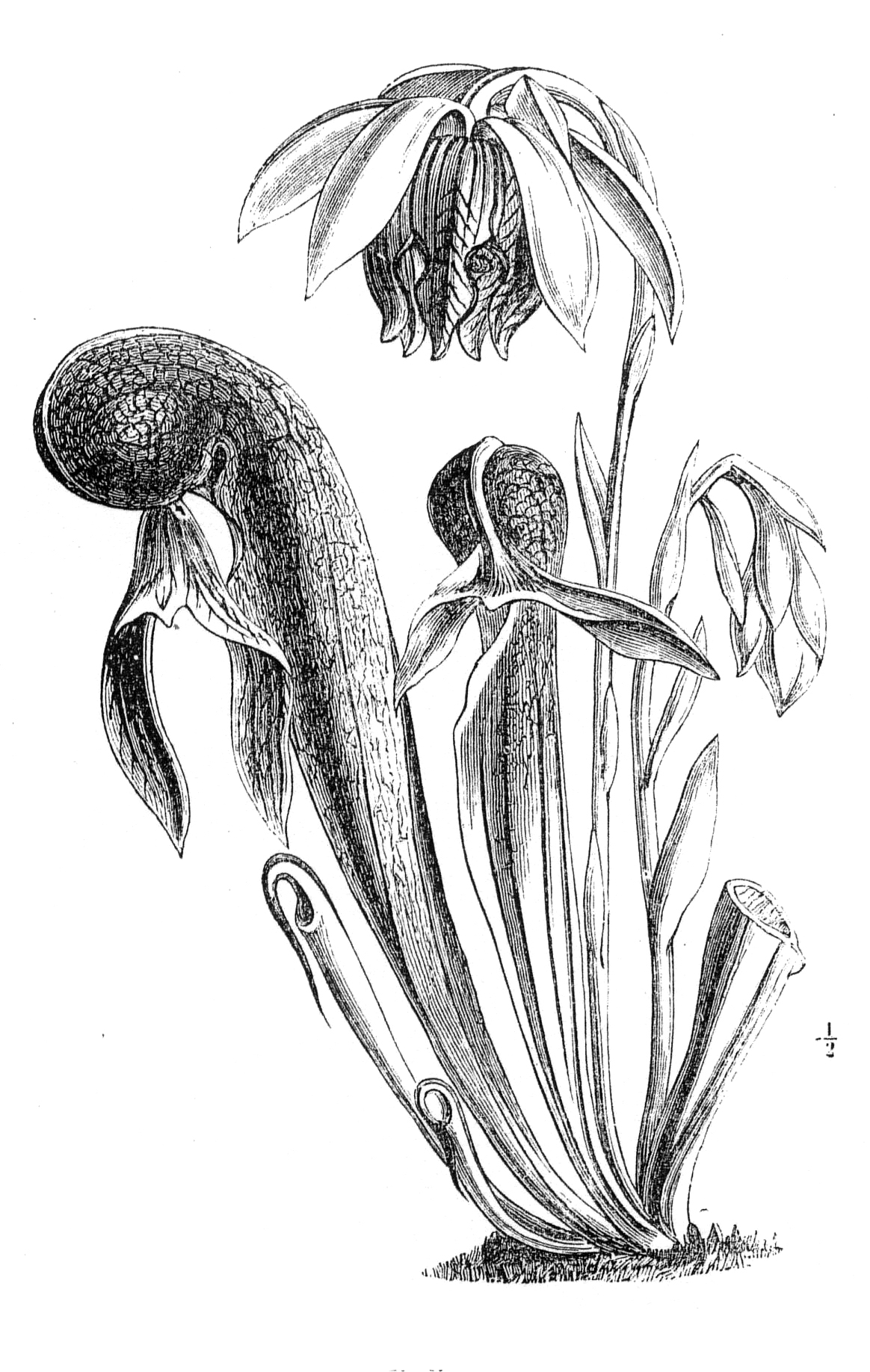
Darlingtonia californica - Macfarlane illustration

John Muirhead Macfarlane FRSE LLD (28 September 1855, Kirkcaldy, Fife – 16 September 1943, Lancaster) was a Scottish botanist.

== Life ==
He was born in Kirkcaldy in Fife on 28 September 1855. He was educated locally, then studied sciences at the University of Edinburgh, first graduating with a BSc, followed by a degree of Doctor of Science in 1883.

He occupied several different academic positions at the University of Edinburgh and the Royal Dick Veterinary College. In 1885 he was elected a fellow of the Royal Society of Edinburgh. His proposers were Alexander Dickson, Robert Gray, Alexander Buchan and Andrew Peebles Aitken. During this period he lived at 3 Bellevue Terrace on the eastern fringe of the New Town. In 1892, he was elected an International Honorary Member of the American Philosophical Society.

In 1893 he travelled to the United States to assume a professorial chair at the University of Pennsylvania. He held this position until retirement in 1920. During his time at the University of Pennsylvania he encouraged botanists such as Edith May Farr. He played a leading role in organising and diversifying the botanical garden of the University of Pennsylvania.

On retiral he returned to Britain and died in Lancaster in northern England on 16 September 1943. John Muirhead Macfarlane died in Lancaster, New Hampshire USA. He is buried in the Durant Road Cemetery in Durant, New Hampshire.

== Publications ==
Macfarlane is best known for his first book, The causes and course of organic evolution. A study in bioenergics (1918). He also wrote many other works including The evolution and distribution of flowering plants (Apocynaceae, Asclepiadaceae) (1933), The evolution and distribution of fishes (1923), Fishes the source of petroleum (1923), and The quantity and sources of our petroleum supplies (1931).

Macfarlane revised the tropical pitcher plant family in his 1908 monograph, "Nepenthaceae".
