= List of Nepenthes endophyte species =

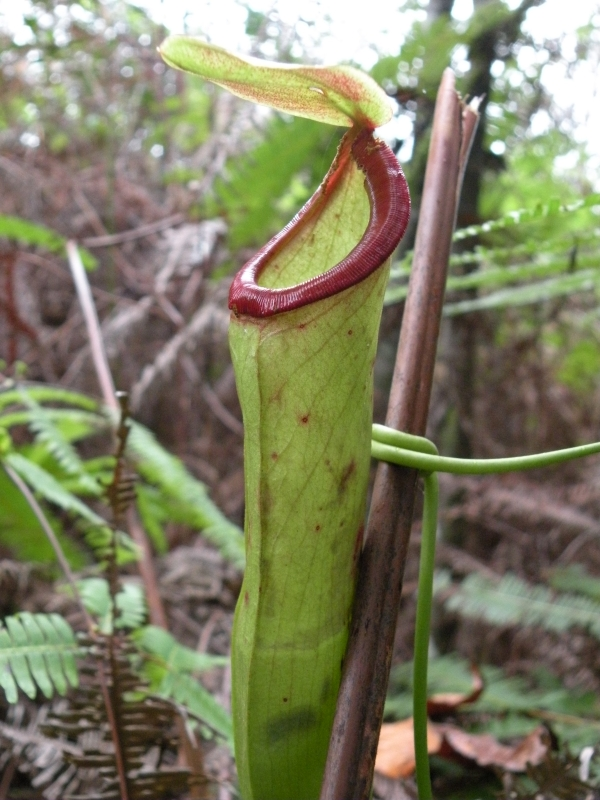
Fifteen strains of bacterial endophytes have been isolated from Nepenthes mirabilis plants originating from Selangor, Peninsular Malaysia. (Upper pitcher of N. mirabilis from Kelantan pictured.)

Numerous endophytes have been recorded from the internal tissues of Nepenthes pitcher plants; that is, organisms that live within the plants for at least part of their life cycles without causing apparent disease.

The endophyte species are listed alphabetically and grouped by genus, family, and phylum. Additional information is included in brackets after the strain designation, namely: the host Nepenthes species from which the endophyte has been recorded; the geographical source of the record; and the type of tissue sampled.

== Bacteria ==
=== Firmicutes ===
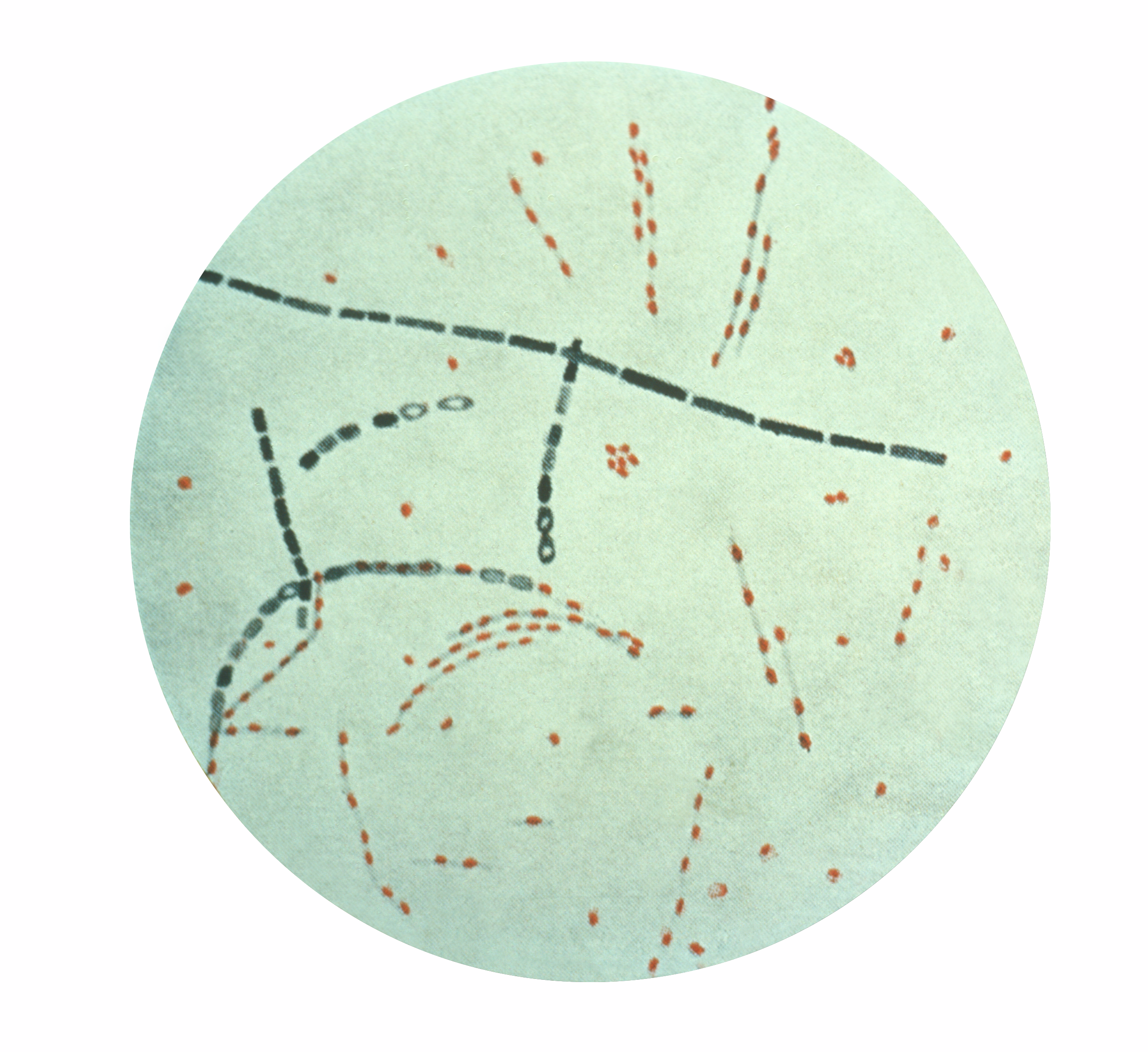
Photomicrograph of Bacillus anthracis (fuchsin-methylene blue spore stain)

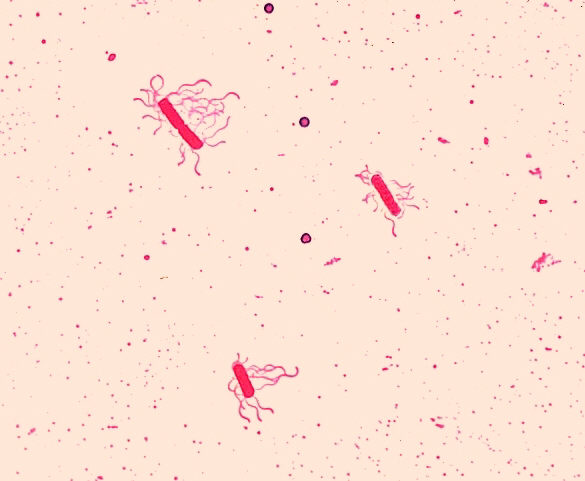
Bacillus cereus (Leifson flagella stain)

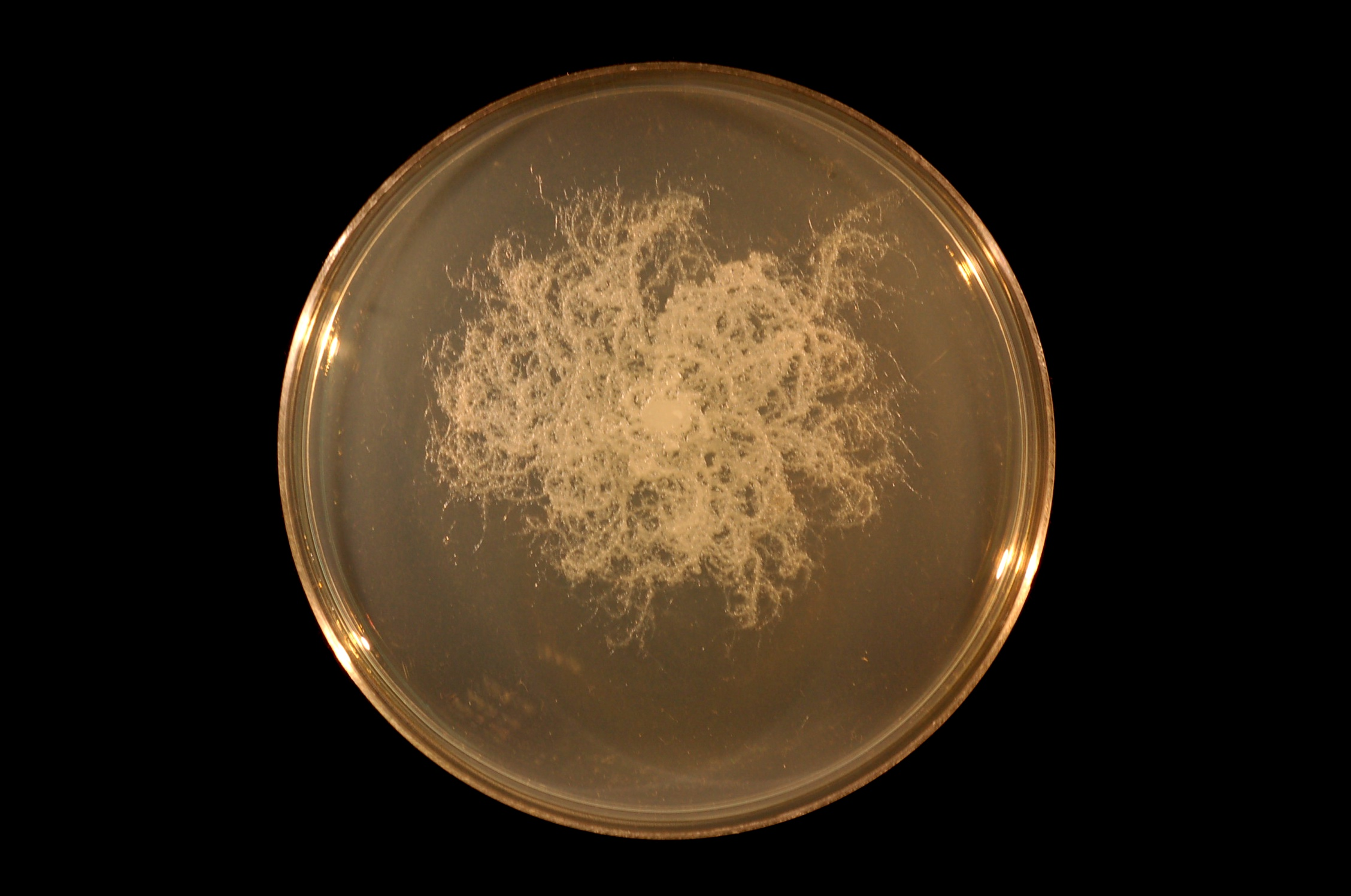
Bacillus mycoides growing on an agar plate

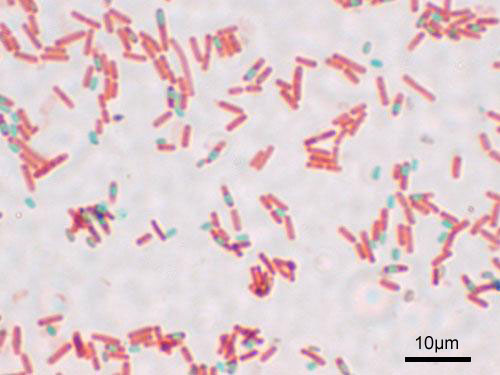
Sporulating Bacillus subtilis

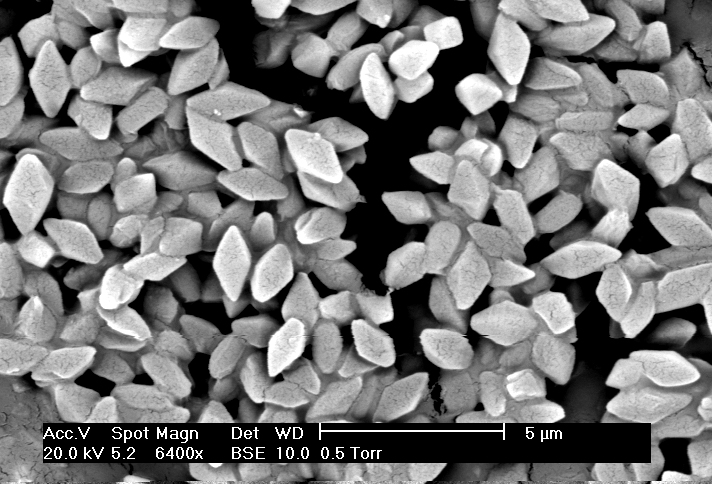
Spores and bipyramidal crystals of Bacillus thuringiensis

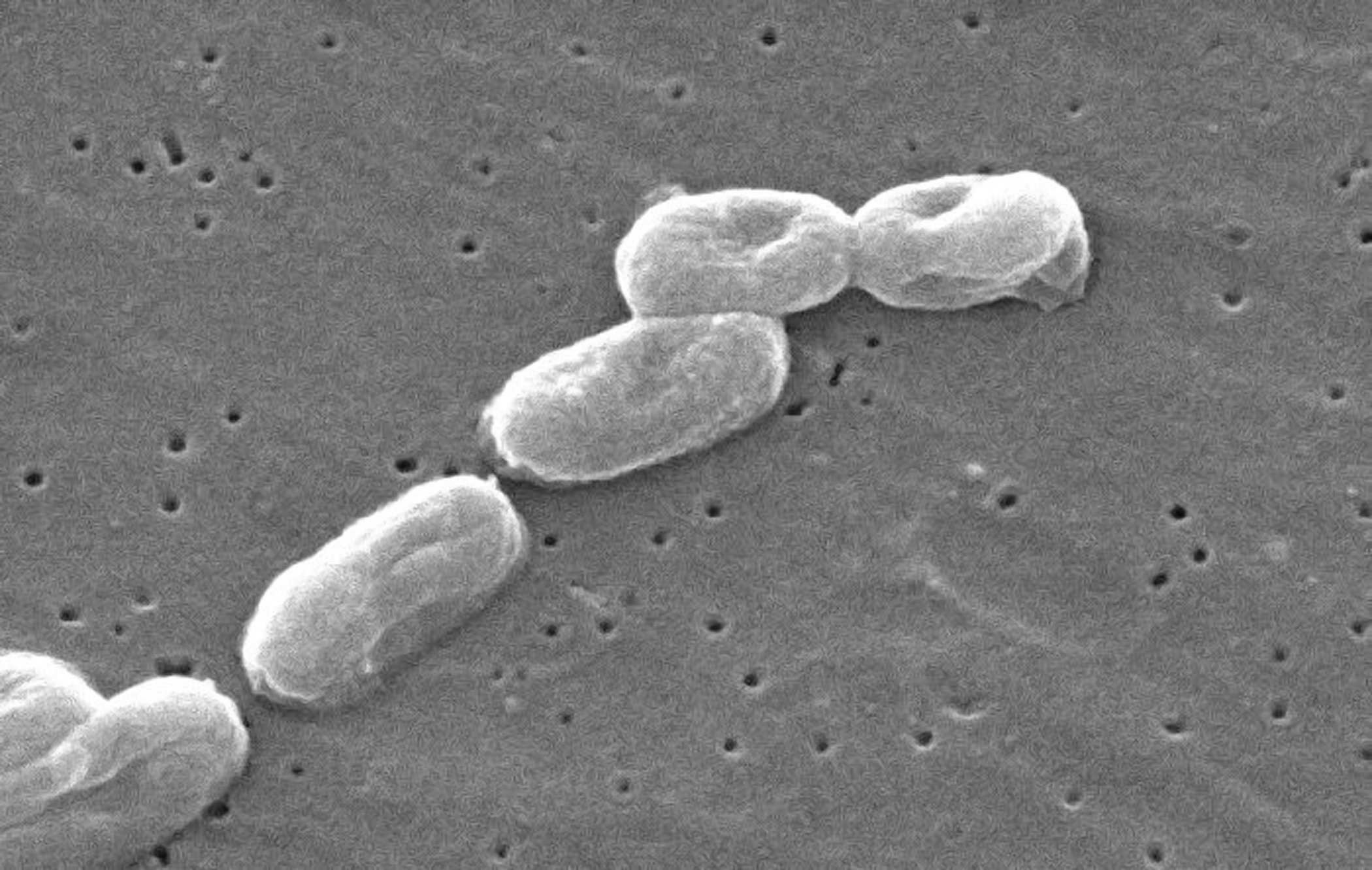
Scanning electron micrograph of Burkholderia cepacia

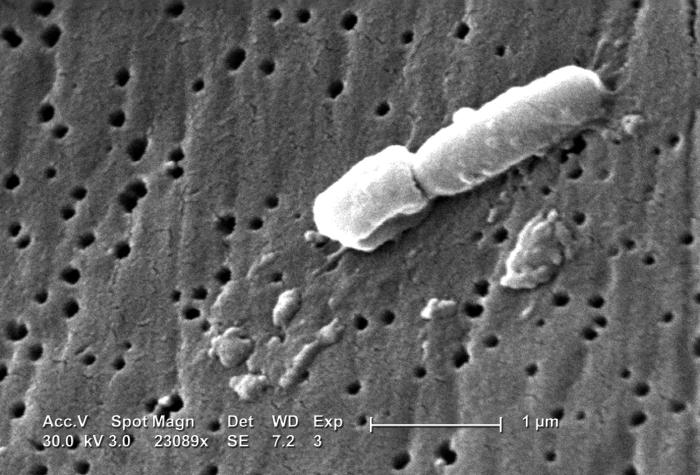
Klebsiella pneumoniae with scale bar

Bacillaceae

- Bacillus
  - Bacillus altitudinis strain AIMST Nae8 (N. ampullaria; Selangor, Malaysia; stem tissue)
  - Bacillus altitudinis strain AIMST Nre3 (N. rafflesiana; Selangor, Malaysia; stem tissue)
  - Bacillus anthracis strain AIMST Nalbe12 (N. alba; Mount Jerai, Kedah, Malaysia; leaf tissue)
  - Bacillus anthracis strain AIMST Nalme12 (N. albomarginata; Mount Jerai, Kedah, Malaysia; stem tissue)
  - Bacillus anthracis strain AIMST Nmae4 (N. macfarlanei; Selangor, Malaysia; leaf tissue)
  - Bacillus aryabhattai strain AIMST Nae11 (N. ampullaria; Selangor, Malaysia; leaf tissue)
  - Bacillus aryabhattai strain AIMST Ngse11 (N. gracilis; Selangor, Malaysia; stem tissue)
  - Bacillus cereus strain AIMST Nalbe1 (N. alba; Mount Jerai, Kedah, Malaysia; leaf tissue)
  - Bacillus cereus strain AIMST Nalbe7 (N. alba; Mount Jerai, Kedah, Malaysia; leaf tissue)
  - Bacillus cereus strain AIMST Nalbe8 (N. alba; Mount Jerai, Kedah, Malaysia; stem tissue)
  - Bacillus cereus strain AIMST Nalme2 (N. albomarginata; Mount Jerai, Kedah, Malaysia; leaf tissue)
  - Bacillus cereus strain AIMST Nalme13 (N. albomarginata; Mount Jerai, Kedah, Malaysia; stem tissue)
  - Bacillus cereus strain AIMST Ngme4 (N. gracillima; Mount Jerai, Kedah, Malaysia; leaf tissue)
  - Bacillus cereus strain AIMST Ngse7 (N. gracilis; Selangor, Malaysia; leaf tissue)
  - Bacillus cereus strain AIMST Ngse9 (N. gracilis; Selangor, Malaysia; leaf tissue)
  - Bacillus cereus strain AIMST Nmae1 (N. macfarlanei; Selangor, Malaysia; stem tissue)
  - Bacillus cereus strain AIMST Nmae3 (N. macfarlanei; Selangor, Malaysia; stem tissue)
  - Bacillus cereus strain AIMST Nmae7 (N. macfarlanei; Selangor, Malaysia; leaf tissue)
  - Bacillus cereus strain AIMST Nmie1 (N. mirabilis; Selangor, Malaysia; leaf tissue)
  - Bacillus cereus strain AIMST Nre2 (N. rafflesiana; Selangor, Malaysia; leaf tissue)
  - Bacillus cereus strain AIMST Nse4 (N. sanguinea; Selangor, Malaysia; leaf tissue)
  - Bacillus cibi strain AIMST Ngme2 (N. gracillima; Mount Jerai, Kedah, Malaysia; leaf tissue)
  - Bacillus cibi strain AIMST Nmae9 (N. macfarlanei; Selangor, Malaysia; leaf tissue)
  - Bacillus flexus strain AIMST Nae10 (N. ampullaria; Selangor, Malaysia; leaf tissue)
  - Bacillus horneckiae strain AIMST Nmie9 (N. mirabilis; Selangor, Malaysia; stem tissue)
  - Bacillus indicus strain AIMST Nae1 (N. ampullaria; Selangor, Malaysia; leaf tissue)
  - Bacillus infantis strain AIMST Nre7 (N. rafflesiana; Selangor, Malaysia; stem tissue)
  - Bacillus koreensis strain AIMST Nae9 (N. ampullaria; Selangor, Malaysia; leaf tissue)
  - Bacillus koreensis strain AIMST Nre4 (N. rafflesiana; Selangor, Malaysia; leaf tissue)
  - Bacillus megaterium strain AIMST Nae5 (N. ampullaria; Selangor, Malaysia; leaf tissue)
  - Bacillus megaterium strain AIMST Ngme6 (N. gracillima; Mount Jerai, Kedah, Malaysia; leaf tissue)
  - Bacillus megaterium strain AIMST Ngme9 (N. gracillima; Mount Jerai, Kedah, Malaysia; stem tissue)
  - Bacillus megaterium strain AIMST Ngse10 (N. gracilis; Selangor, Malaysia; stem tissue)
  - Bacillus megaterium strain AIMST Nmae2 (N. macfarlanei; Selangor, Malaysia; stem tissue)
  - Bacillus megaterium strain AIMST Nre8 (N. rafflesiana; Selangor, Malaysia; leaf tissue)
  - Bacillus megaterium strain AIMST Nse1 (N. sanguinea; Selangor, Malaysia; leaf tissue)
  - Bacillus megaterium strain AIMST Nse2 (N. sanguinea; Selangor, Malaysia; stem tissue)
  - Bacillus methylotrophicus strain AIMST Ngme10 (N. gracillima; Mount Jerai, Kedah, Malaysia; stem tissue)
  - Bacillus methylotrophicus strain AIMST Ngse3 (N. gracilis; Selangor, Malaysia; leaf tissue)
  - Bacillus mycoides strain AIMST Ngse12 (N. gracilis; Selangor, Malaysia; stem tissue)
  - Bacillus pumilus strain AIMST Ngme11 (N. gracillima; Mount Jerai, Kedah, Malaysia; stem tissue)
  - Bacillus pumilus strain AIMST Nmie11 (N. mirabilis; Selangor, Malaysia; stem tissue)
  - Bacillus pumilus strain AIMST Nmie15 (N. mirabilis; Selangor, Malaysia; leaf tissue)
  - Bacillus pumilus strain AIMST Nre1 (N. rafflesiana; Selangor, Malaysia; leaf tissue)
  - Bacillus pumilus strain AIMST Nre6 (N. rafflesiana; Selangor, Malaysia; stem tissue)
  - Bacillus stratosphericus strain AIMST Nmie13 (N. mirabilis; Selangor, Malaysia; leaf tissue)
  - Bacillus subtilis strain AIMST Nae3 (N. ampullaria; Selangor, Malaysia; leaf tissue)
  - Bacillus subtilis strain AIMST Nalme1 (N. albomarginata; Mount Jerai, Kedah, Malaysia; leaf tissue)
  - Bacillus subtilis strain AIMST Nmae5 (N. macfarlanei; Selangor, Malaysia; leaf tissue)
  - Bacillus subtilis strain AIMST Nre5 (N. rafflesiana; Selangor, Malaysia; leaf tissue)
  - Bacillus thuringiensis strain AIMST Nalme11 (N. albomarginata; Mount Jerai, Kedah, Malaysia; leaf tissue)
  - Bacillus thuringiensis strain AIMST Ngme12 (N. gracillima; Mount Jerai, Kedah, Malaysia; leaf tissue)
  - Bacillus thuringiensis strain AIMST Ngse6 (N. gracilis; Selangor, Malaysia; leaf tissue)
- Lysinibacillus
  - Lysinibacillus sphaericus strain AIMST Nmae8 (N. macfarlanei; Selangor, Malaysia; leaf tissue)
  - Lysinibacillus sphaericus strain AIMST Nmie14 (N. mirabilis; Selangor, Malaysia; leaf tissue)
  - Lysinibacillus xylanilyticus strain AIMST Nmae6 (N. macfarlanei; Selangor, Malaysia; leaf tissue)

Paenibacillaceae

- Brevibacillus
  - Brevibacillus parabrevis strain AIMST Nmie12 (N. mirabilis; Selangor, Malaysia; leaf tissue)

=== Proteobacteria ===
Alcaligenaceae

- Achromobacter
  - Achromobacter piechaudii strain AIMST Nmie10 (N. mirabilis; Selangor, Malaysia; stem tissue)
  - Achromobacter xylosoxidans strain AIMST Nae7 (N. ampullaria; Selangor, Malaysia; stem tissue)
  - Achromobacter xylosoxidans strain AIMST Nalme8 (N. albomarginata; Mount Jerai, Kedah, Malaysia; leaf tissue)

Burkholderiaceae

- Burkholderia
  - Burkholderia cepacia strain AIMST Ngse1 (N. gracilis; Selangor, Malaysia; leaf tissue)
  - Burkholderia multivorans strain AIMST Ngse2 (N. gracilis; Selangor, Malaysia; leaf tissue)

Enterobacteriaceae

- Citrobacter
  - Citrobacter freundii strain AIMST Nalme3 (N. albomarginata; Mount Jerai, Kedah, Malaysia; leaf tissue)
  - Citrobacter freundii strain AIMST Ngme7 (N. gracillima; Mount Jerai, Kedah, Malaysia; leaf tissue)
  - Citrobacter freundii strain AIMST Ngse8 (N. gracilis; Selangor, Malaysia; leaf tissue)
  - Citrobacter gillenii strain AIMST Nalbe11 (N. alba; Mount Jerai, Kedah, Malaysia; leaf tissue)
  - Citrobacter youngae strain AIMST Ngme8 (N. gracillima; Mount Jerai, Kedah, Malaysia; leaf tissue)
- Enterobacter
  - Enterobacter asburiae strain AIMST Nae4 (N. ampullaria; Selangor, Malaysia; stem tissue)
  - Enterobacter asburiae strain AIMST Nae6 (N. ampullaria; Selangor, Malaysia; leaf tissue)
- Klebsiella
  - Klebsiella oxytoca strain AIMST Nae2 (N. ampullaria; Selangor, Malaysia; leaf tissue)
  - Klebsiella pneumoniae strain AIMST Nalme7 (N. albomarginata; Mount Jerai, Kedah, Malaysia; stem tissue)
  - Klebsiella pneumoniae strain AIMST Ngse5 (N. gracilis; Selangor, Malaysia; leaf tissue)
- Kluyvera
  - Kluyvera ascorbata strain AIMST Nalme9 (N. albomarginata; Mount Jerai, Kedah, Malaysia; leaf tissue)
  - Kluyvera intermedia strain AIMST Nalme10 (N. albomarginata; Mount Jerai, Kedah, Malaysia; leaf tissue)
  - Kluyvera intermedia strain AIMST Ngse13 (N. gracilis; Selangor, Malaysia; leaf tissue)
- Leclercia
  - Leclercia adecarboxylata strain AIMST Nmie6 (N. mirabilis; Selangor, Malaysia; leaf tissue)
- Pantoea
  - Pantoea agglomerans strain AIMST Nmie3 (N. mirabilis; Selangor, Malaysia; leaf tissue)
  - Pantoea agglomerans strain AIMST Nmie8 (N. mirabilis; Selangor, Malaysia; stem tissue)
  - Pantoea ananatis strain AIMST Nmie2 (N. mirabilis; Selangor, Malaysia; leaf tissue)
  - Pantoea stewartii strain AIMST Nmie4 (N. mirabilis; Selangor, Malaysia; leaf tissue)
- Providencia
  - Providencia alcalifaciens strain AIMST Nmie5 (N. mirabilis; Selangor, Malaysia; leaf tissue)
- Serratia
  - Serratia liquefaciens strain AIMST Nmie7 (N. mirabilis; Selangor, Malaysia; stem tissue)
- Yokenella
  - Yokenella regensburgei strain AIMST Nalbe2 (N. alba; Mount Jerai, Kedah, Malaysia; leaf tissue)
  - Yokenella regensburgei strain AIMST Nalbe3 (N. alba; Mount Jerai, Kedah, Malaysia; stem tissue)

Moraxellaceae

- Acinetobacter
  - Acinetobacter calcoaceticus strain AIMST Nalbe4 (N. alba; Mount Jerai, Kedah, Malaysia; stem tissue)
  - Acinetobacter calcoaceticus strain AIMST Nalbe10 (N. alba; Mount Jerai, Kedah, Malaysia; leaf tissue)
  - Acinetobacter calcoaceticus strain AIMST Ngme3 (N. gracillima; Mount Jerai, Kedah, Malaysia; leaf tissue)
  - Acinetobacter calcoaceticus strain AIMST Ngse4 (N. gracilis; Selangor, Malaysia; leaf tissue)
  - Acinetobacter radioresistens strain AIMST Nalbe6 (N. alba; Mount Jerai, Kedah, Malaysia; leaf tissue)
  - Acinetobacter soli strain AIMST Nalbe5 (N. alba; Mount Jerai, Kedah, Malaysia; leaf tissue)

Xanthomonadaceae

- Stenotrophomonas
  - Stenotrophomonas maltophilia strain AIMST Nalbe9 (N. alba; Mount Jerai, Kedah, Malaysia; stem tissue)
  - Stenotrophomonas maltophilia strain AIMST Nalme4 (N. albomarginata; Mount Jerai, Kedah, Malaysia; leaf tissue)
  - Stenotrophomonas maltophilia strain AIMST Nalme5 (N. albomarginata; Mount Jerai, Kedah, Malaysia; stem tissue)
  - Stenotrophomonas maltophilia strain AIMST Nalme6 (N. albomarginata; Mount Jerai, Kedah, Malaysia; stem tissue)
  - Stenotrophomonas maltophilia strain AIMST Ngme1 (N. gracillima; Mount Jerai, Kedah, Malaysia; leaf tissue)
  - Stenotrophomonas pavanii strain AIMST Ngme5 (N. gracillima; Mount Jerai, Kedah, Malaysia; leaf tissue)

== See also ==
- General list of endophytes
