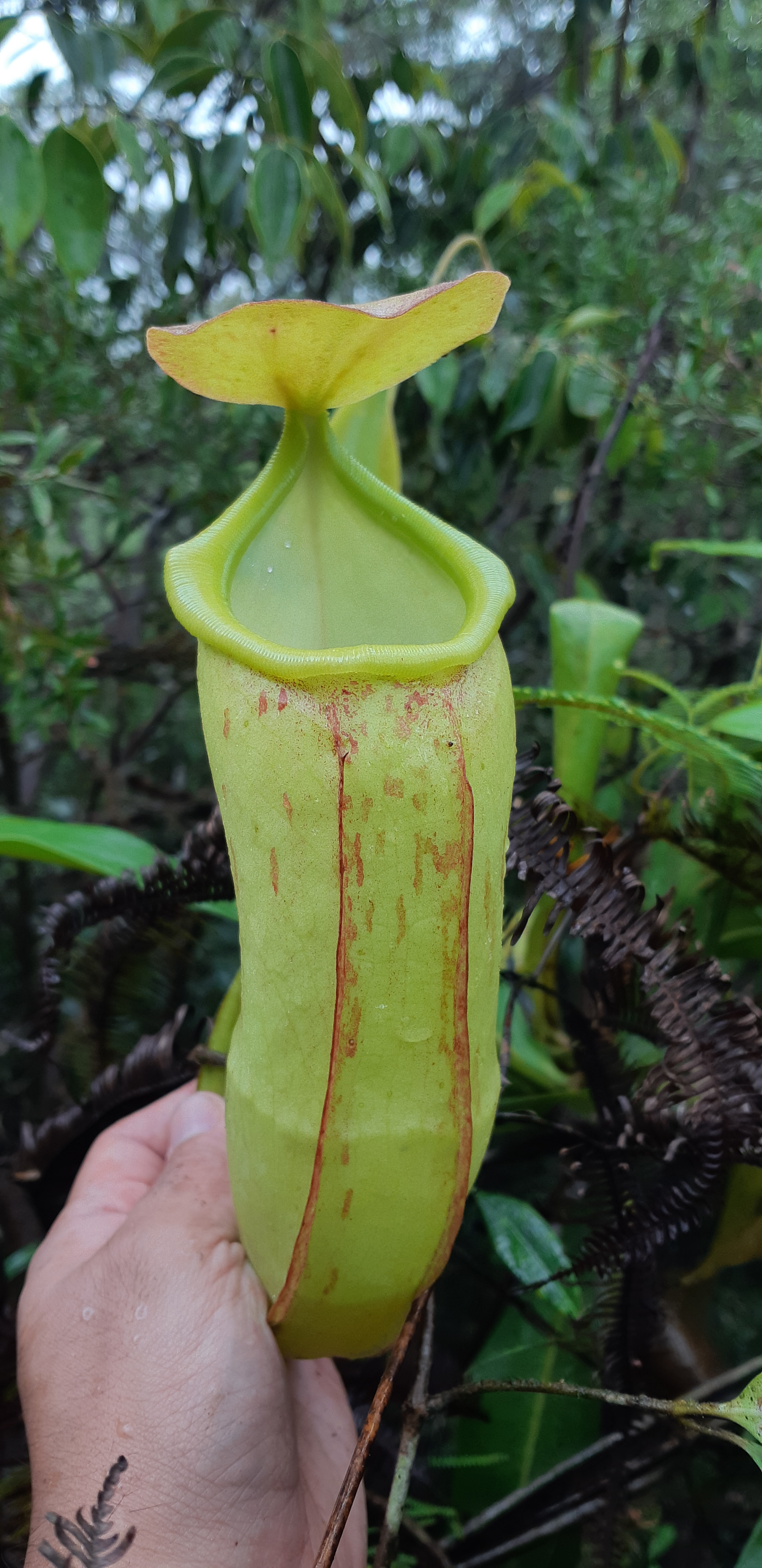

Scientific classification
- Kingdom: Plantae
- Clade: Tracheophytes
- Clade: Angiosperms
- Clade: Eudicots
- Order: Caryophyllales
- Family: Nepenthaceae
- Genus: Nepenthes
- Species: N. latiffiana

Binomial name
- Nepenthes latiffiana M.N.Faizal, A.Amin & Dome

= Nepenthes latiffiana =

Species of pitcher plant

Nepenthes latiffiana is a pitcher plant species from Peninsular Malaysia described in the year 2020 (the other two being N. domei and N. malayensis). It has been published in Webbia Journal of Plant Taxonomy and Geography in the first issue, volume 75, and made as the cover page for that issue. This species was described by Mohd Norfaizal Ghazalli (Ph.D), Amin Asyraf Tamizi and Dome Nikong, and name after a retired Professor of Botany from Universiti Kebangsaan Malaysia (the National University of Malaysia) - Emeritus Professor Dato' Dr. Abdul Latiff Mohamad. The description was based on materials collected from a restricted area at the type locality in Setiu, Terengganu. Nepenthes latiffiana is characterized by a combination of green-yellowish-brown (peachy) coloration and several red blotches on its lower pitchers and light green upper pitchers that have 'flap-like' structures at the sides of the mouth due to expanded structure on the lateral sides of the peristomes.

== Plant characteristics ==
Nepenthes latiffiana differs from N. sanguinea in peristome morphology which is considerably developed, loosely cylindrical, with expanded outer margin part towards both sides (lateral) of the mouth forming flap-like structure which is especially prominent in upper pitchers (vs. simple, expanded, outer margin usually markedly sinuate where the peristome is widest); climbing stem with simple hairs, cross section cylindrical (vs. glabrous, sharply angular) and lid margin slight wavy to wavy that retains it morphology in dried and wet specimens.

This species is a terrestrial climber that grows as understorey plants on the hill slopes with rocky substratum at about 1,000–1,100 m above sea level. The vegetation of the locality consisted of various montane species dominated by Dicranopteris linearis (Gleicheniaceae), Dipteris conjugata (Dipteridaceae) and Machaerina maingayi (Cyperaceae), thriving together with rattans, Pandanus sp. and Leptospermum flavescens.

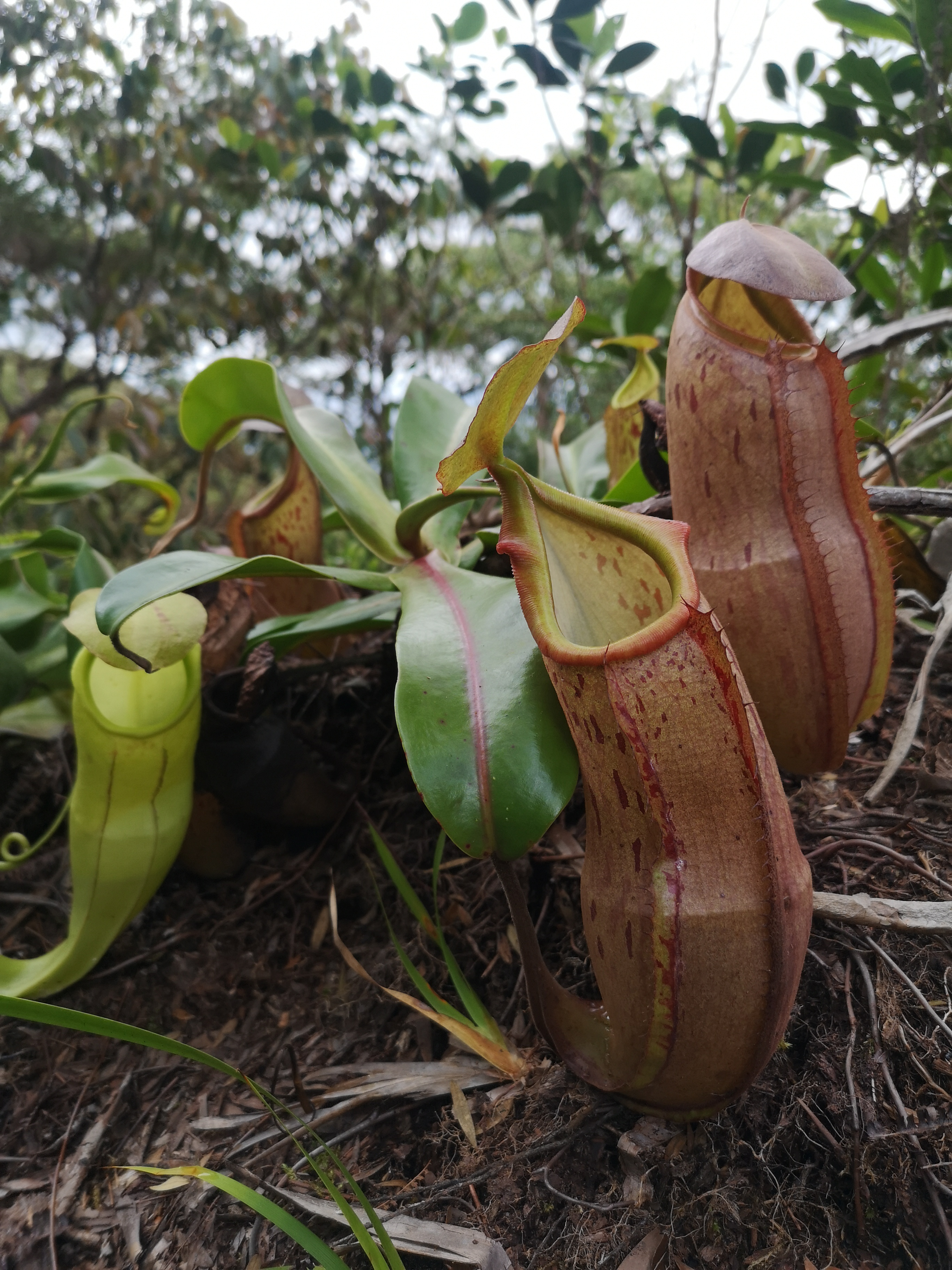
Nepenthes latiffiana lower pitchers and a single upper pitcher to the side.
