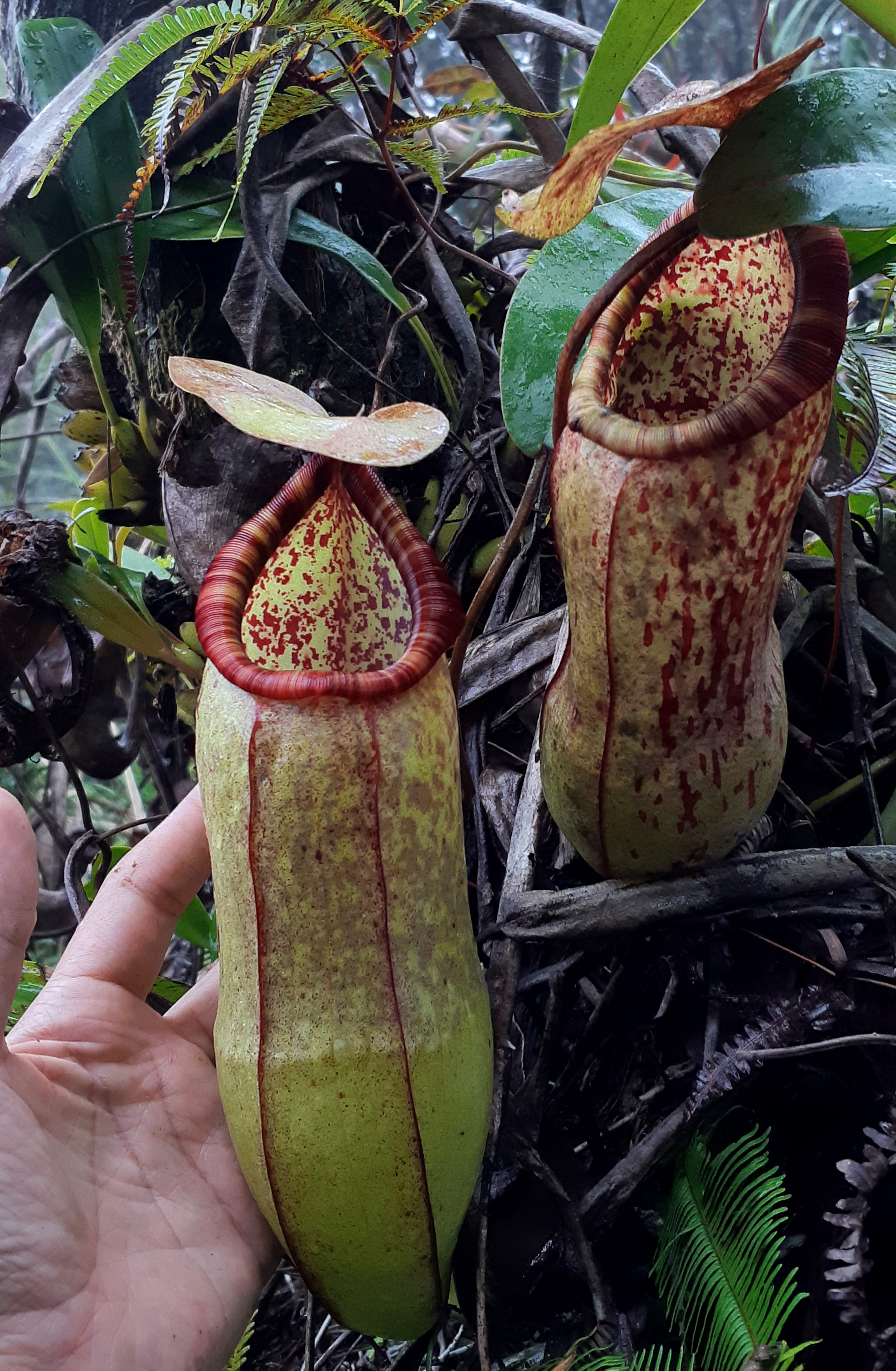

Conservation status
- Critically Endangered (IUCN 3.1)

Scientific classification
- Kingdom: Plantae
- Clade: Tracheophytes
- Clade: Angiosperms
- Clade: Eudicots
- Order: Caryophyllales
- Family: Nepenthaceae
- Genus: Nepenthes
- Species: N. malayensis

Binomial name
- Nepenthes malayensis A.Amin, M.N.Faizal & Dome

= Nepenthes malayensis =

Species of carnivorous plant

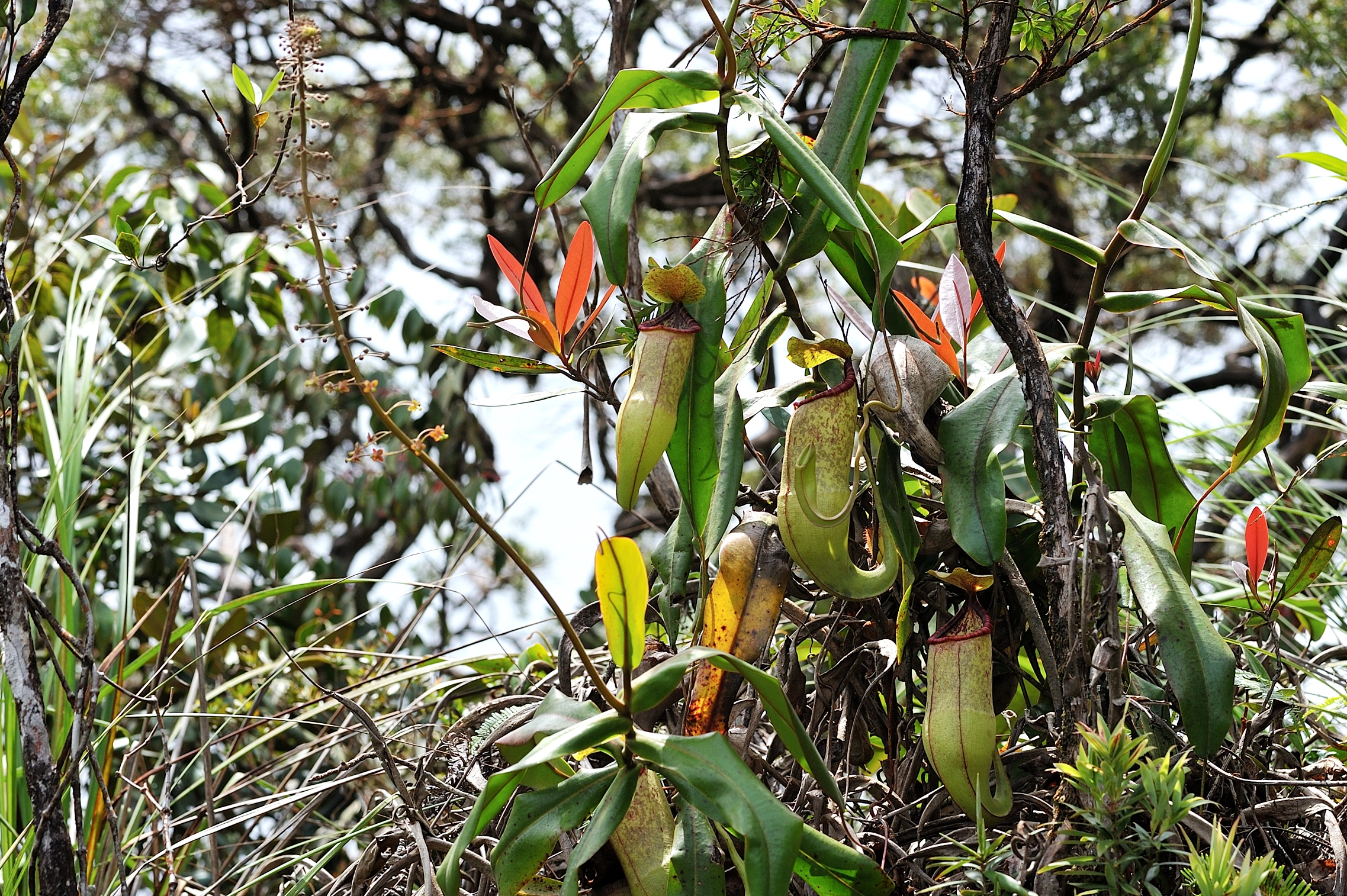
Nepenthes malayensis upper pitchers and climbing stems (Photo by M. Alias)

Nepenthes malayensis (A.Amin, M.N.Faizal & Dome), or the striped Malayan montane pitcher plant, is a large species of carnivorous tropical pitcher plant native and endemic to eastern mountains of Peninsular Malaysia. The peristomes on both upper and lower pitchers are profusely adorned by reddish bands, or stripes, making the species rather attractive. It grows close to mountain summits around 800–1,000 m above sea level in partially shaded areas, though some individuals have been seen growing in open areas. The species was first observed in 2018 and initially thought to be conspecific with N. sanguinea. Nepenthes malayensis formal description was published in late 2020 in Kew Bulletin and it is one of the three Malayan species described in the same year (the other two was N. latiffiana and N. domei).

Nepenthes malayensis is listed in the International Plant Names Index (PNI), and its taxonomic position gets briefly reviewed (and recognized as a distinct species) in Dionée 2021 – a French-language official publication by Association Francophone des Amateurs de Plantes Carnivores (a French carnivorous plant society). The species joins a batch of newly described Nepenthes highlighted in New Nepenthes (vol. 2), a work by Stewart McPherson, and also in Associazione Italiana Piante Carnivore Magazine (AIPC) 62. The rRNA-ITS DNA region of N. malayensis has been sequenced and deposited to National Center for Biotechnology Information (NCBI) database under the GenBank accession number MN347033.1.

This species has not been brought into the cultivation and the locations of the local populations have never been disclosed. Nepenthes malayensis only inhabits montane forests which are within the protected areas under the jurisdiction of the State Forestry Department, thus removing the plants from its habitat is considered poaching and legal actions can be taken. Collection of this critically endangered N. malayensis, as well as unauthorised possession of the species, is an offence and unlawful.

== Discovery and Taxonomy ==
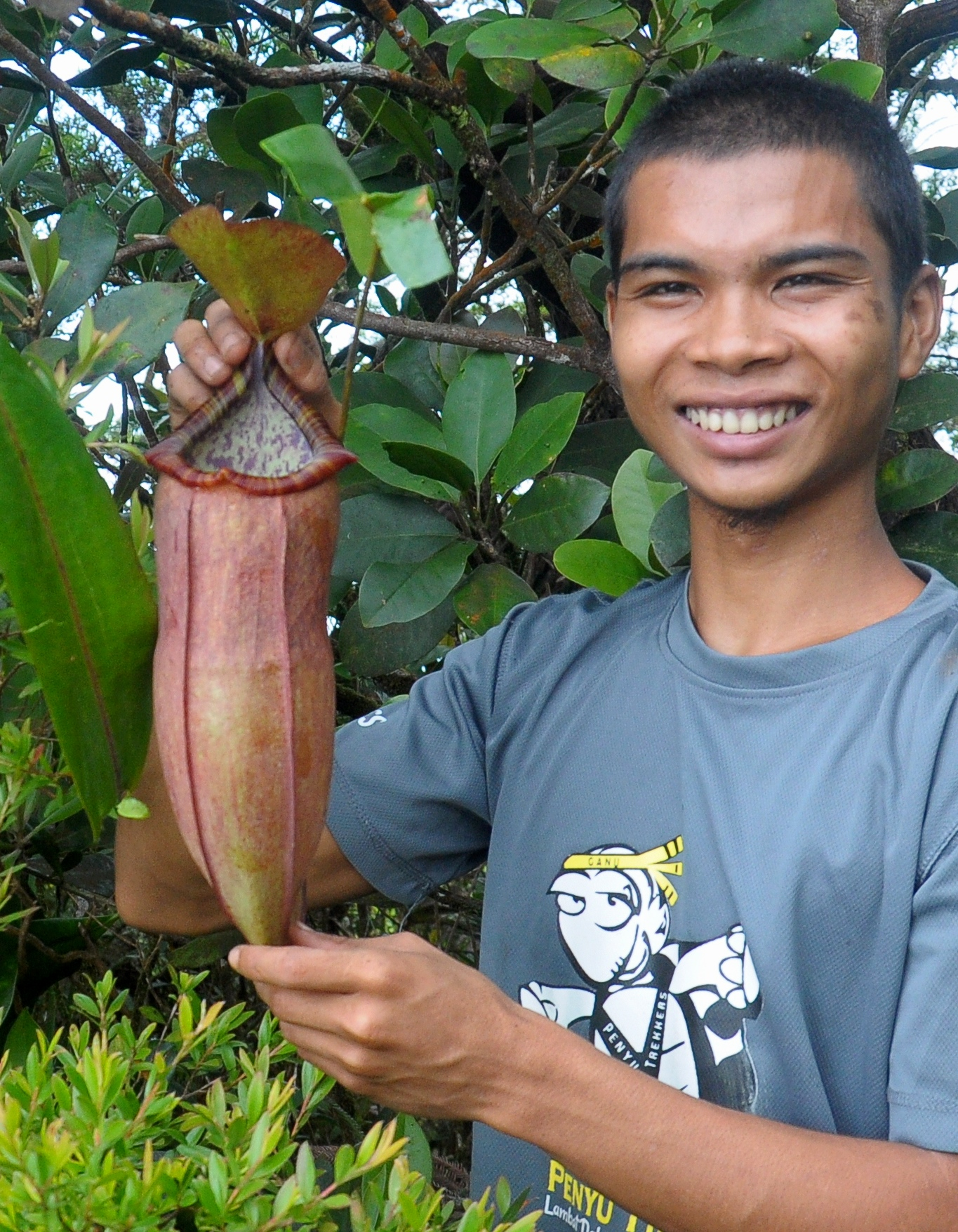
A large reddish upper trap of N. malayensis reaching 35 cm tall held by M. Alias. This very photograph was the one that firstly caught the attention of A. A. Tamizi, which brought the species to its formal description a couple of years after its first sighting in 2018.

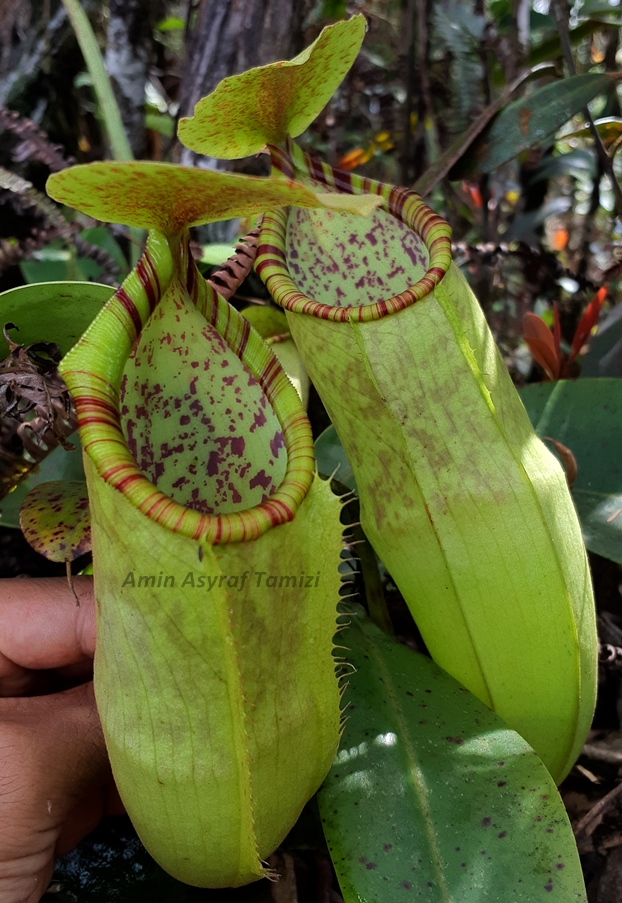
Green lower pitchers of N. malayensis

Nepenthes malayensis was first sighted by two local nature photographers Dome Nikong and Mohamad Alias Shakri in 2018. Alias casually shared the sighting on his social media which later caught A. A. Tamizi 's attention in the same year who has been collecting information on Nepenthes in Malaysian forests since 2013. A field research crews composed of Dr. Mohd Norfaizal Ghazalli (MARDI, plant taxonomist), Amin Asyraf Tamizi (MARDI, molecular biologist), Dr. Edward Entalai Besi (UPM, plant taxonomist) and Muhamad Ikhawanuddin Mat Esa (UPM, ethnobotanist), and together with the two photographers, was promptly lined-up to have a closer look on the original population. The new plant was also appraised by Emeritus Professor Dato' Dr. Abdul Latiff Mohamad, a prominent national plant taxonomist from Univerisiti Kebangsaan Malaysia (UKM), as a undescribed species through photographs and specimens. The species was then formally described by Amin Asyraf Tamizi, Mohd Norfaizal Ghazalli and Dome Nikong, which was published in Kew Bulletin (vol. 75) on 20 December 2020.

The name 'malayensis' (- of Malaya) signifies the endemism of this species to Malaya, or Peninsular Malaysia, specifically to the eastern mountain range. Nepenthes malayensis was assessed as a critically endangered (CR) species according to the IUCN criteria since very few individuals were observed prior to the publication of the article. This status may require a reassessment following a recent sighting of a few N. malayensis individuals in a neighboring mountain.

The species was mistaken as an allied taxon to N. sanguinea on the first sight due to a slight resemblance of the upper pitchers in green individuals. Detailed characterisation of the upper stems, lower pitchers, leaf surface, vascular bundle and DNA sequence (rRNA-ITS) have since established N. malayensis as a distinct species. Diagnostic characteristics that make N. malayensis distinct from N. sanguinea are cylindrical to broadly angular stem (vs. sharply angular), finely pubescent (hairy) leaves, pitchers and tendrils (vs. glabrescent), and stout to broad-cylindrical pitchers which are slightly constricting in the middle and below peristome (vs. narrow pitchers, funnel shaped). This huge Malayan Nepenthes also sports prominent stripes on the peristomes - an attribute persistent in both upper and lower pitchers of all individuals observed so far. Individuals with green pitchers were the most sighted natural varieties while dark-reddish varieties were less common and considered a rarity. Despite having morphological and geographical differences, the 610 bp rRNA-ITS sequence alignment shows N. malayensis shares the highest sequence similarity (99.84%) with three Peninsular Malaysian species – N. sanguinea, N. benstonei and N. albomarginata. A longer sequence coverage of the DNA region, or an alternative barcode region (such as rbcL gene) should have yielded a different result.

Compared to N. sanguinea, N. malayensis has not been observed growing on soil in its natural habitat. Nepenthes malayensis exclusively grows on humus accumulated on rocks (facultative lithophytic) or moss banks on tree branches making it a non-terrestrial Nepenthes, which might be the main factor of its elusiveness from past researchers and explorers.

Nepenthes malayensis joins the rank of large Nepenthes ever recorded in the wild as mature plants can grow pitchers up to 35 cm tall with volume around 800 mL. Nepenthes rajah, the largest species from Sabah, can grow pitchers up to 41 cm tall while N. truncata from southern Philippines and N. attenboroughii from Palawan have been recorded to produce pitchers 40 cm and 30 cm tall, respectively.

== Nothospecies (natural hybrid) ==
Nothospecies (natural hybrids) of N. malayensis possibly exist within the same habitat based on sightings of some plants that resembled N. malayensis (but with slight different pitcher morphology especially the lid) and this has not been properly documented.
