= N. alba =

N. alba may refer to:

- Nepenthes alba, a tropical pitcher plant species endemic to Peninsular Malaysia
- Nymphaea alba, the European white waterlily, white lotus or nenuphar, a freshwater aquatic flowering plant species found all over Europe and in parts of North Africa and the Middle East

== See also ==
- Alba (disambiguation)
