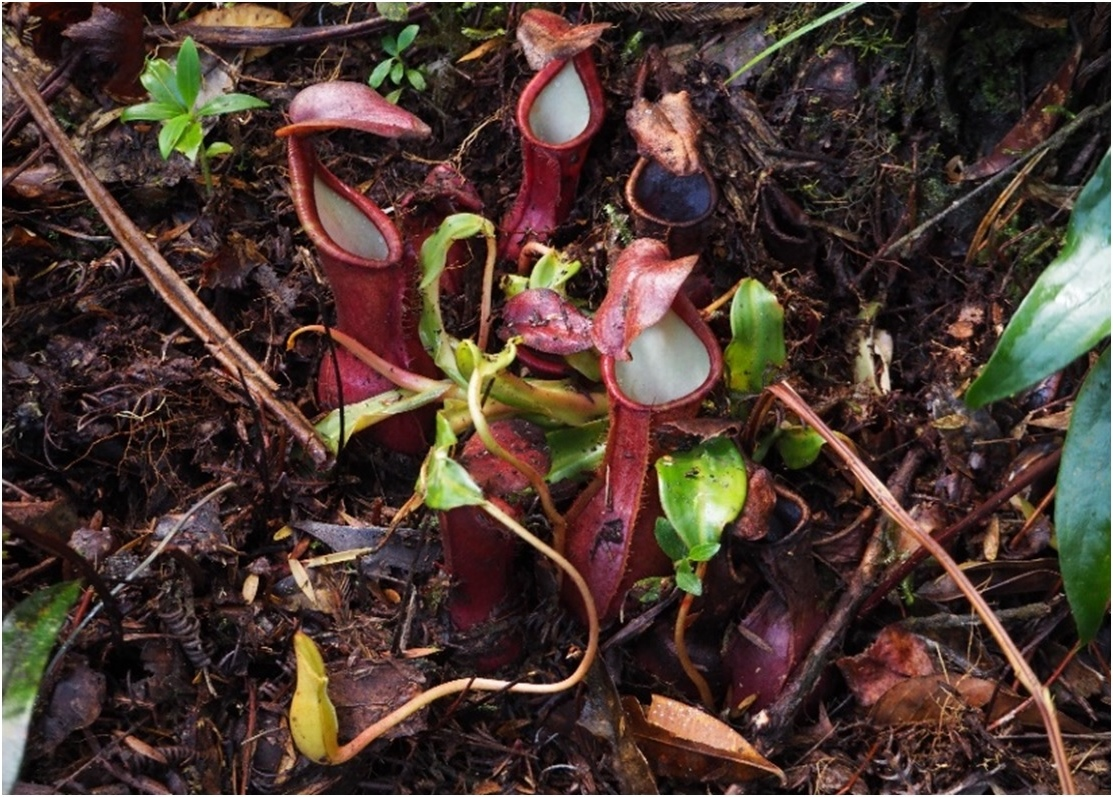
- Unearthed rosette pitchers

Scientific classification
- Kingdom: Plantae
- Clade: Tracheophytes
- Clade: Angiosperms
- Clade: Eudicots
- Order: Caryophyllales
- Family: Nepenthaceae
- Genus: Nepenthes
- Species: N. domei

Binomial name
- Nepenthes domei M.N.Faizal, A.Amin & Latiff

= Nepenthes domei =

Species of carnivorous plant

Nepenthes domei is a species of carnivorous tropical pitcher plant native to Peninsular Malaysia, growing at 800–1,000 m above sea level. The species' description was published in Webbia together with N. latiffiana, and it is one of the latest three new Malayan species described in the same year (the third species is N. malayensis). These discoveries have now made Peninsular Malaysia home to 15 species of Nepenthes.

Nepenthes domei is listed in the International Plant Names Index (IPNI) and named in honour of the first person who discovered the population, Mr. Dome Nikong.

== Description ==
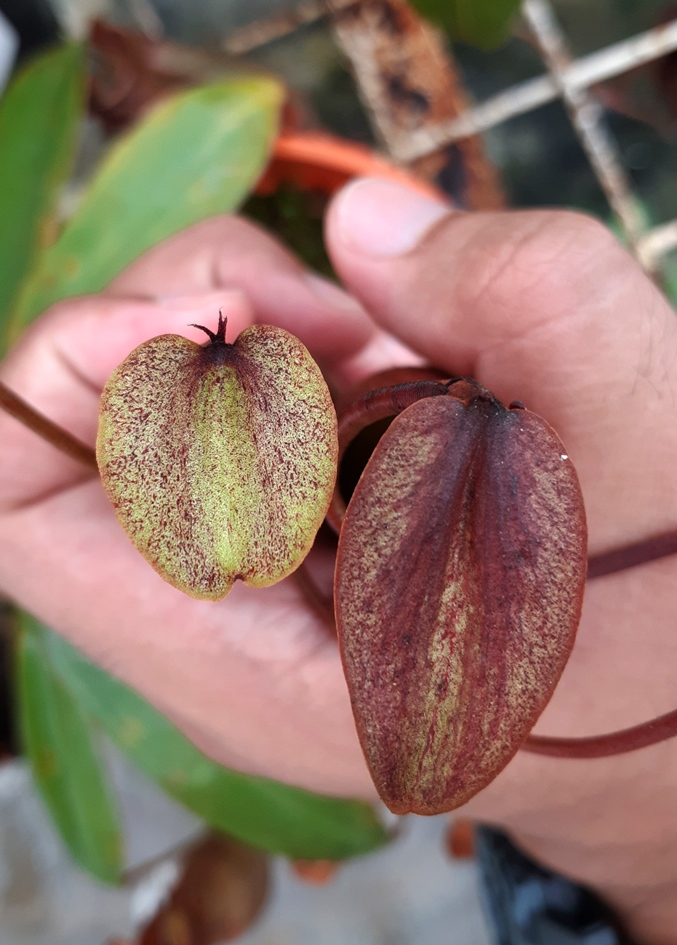
Difference in lid shape between N. benstonei (left) and N. domei (right). Both plants are grown in the same glasshouse.

This species is closely related to N. benstonei of Bukit Bakar even some argue that both of them are basically the same species but with some variations. However, the lower pitchers of Nepenthes domei were noted to be rounder and stouter compared to those of N. benstonei and they exhibit burrowing behavior which is a rather unique characteristic not observed in the later taxon. The pitchers of N. domei tend to burrow deep into the humus with the mouth parts pop up out of the ground and 3/4 of the lower parts remain buried. This adaption could be advantageous in trapping insects crawling close to the forest floor and this burrowing behavior is persistent in plants grown in glasshouse where the growing tendrils would penetrate sphagnum, or loose substrate, before the tips inflated into reddish pitchers. Mature plants of N. domei with climbing stems tend to produce often half-buried rosette pitchers that are attached to shorter tendrils with reduced leaf blade (lamina). Compared to N. benstonei whose lids are ovate, the lids of N. domei lower pitchers are much narrower even some individuals have lanceolate lids.
