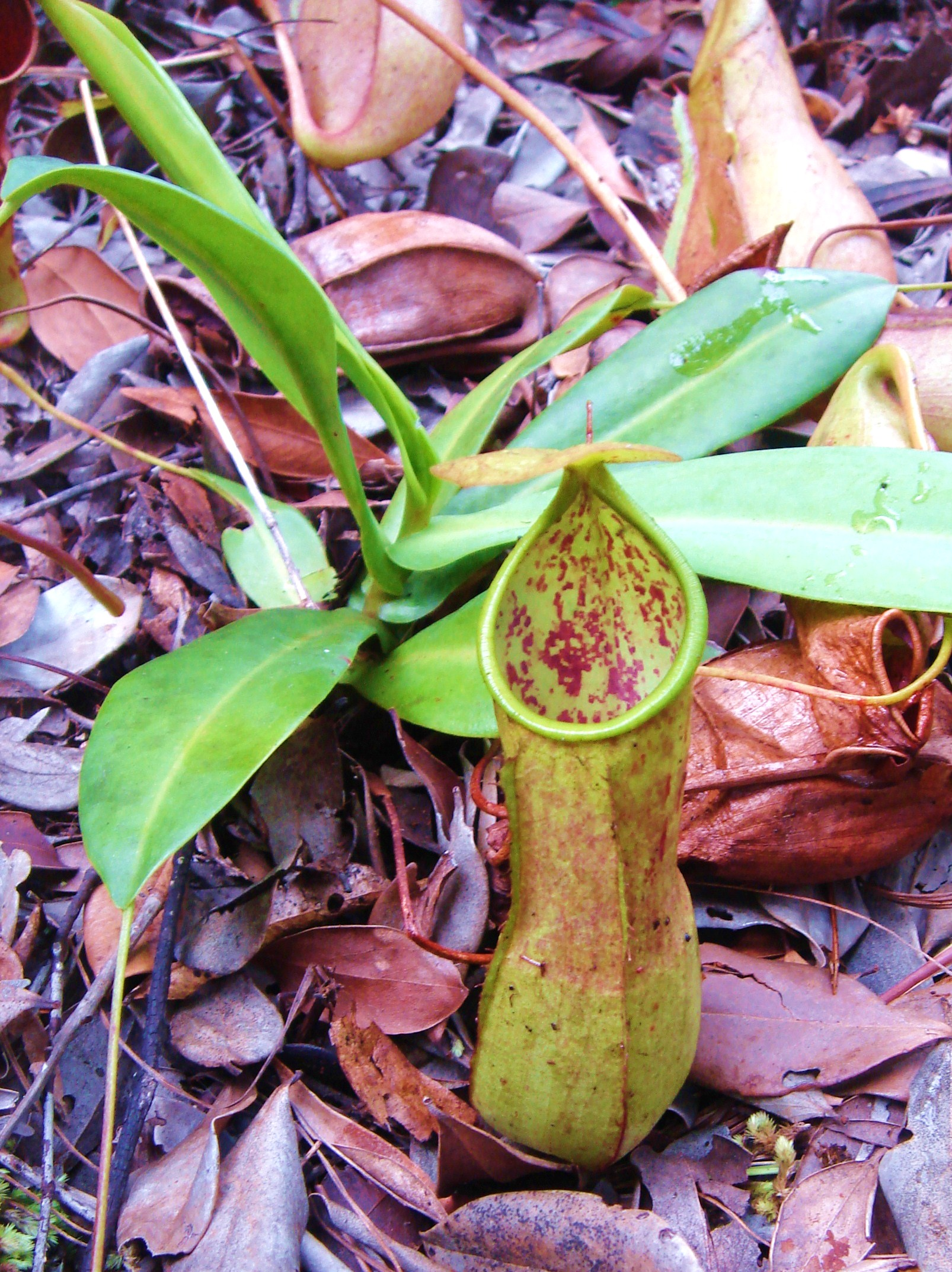

Scientific classification
- Kingdom: Plantae
- Clade: Tracheophytes
- Clade: Angiosperms
- Clade: Eudicots
- Order: Caryophyllales
- Family: Nepenthaceae
- Genus: Nepenthes
- Species: N. thai

Binomial name
- Nepenthes thai Cheek (2009)

Synonyms
- Nepenthes benstonei auct. non C.Clarke (1999): Cheek & Jebb (2001) [=N. benstonei/N. thai]

= Nepenthes thai =

Species of pitcher plant from Thailand

Nepenthes thai is a tropical pitcher plant endemic to peninsular Thailand. It grows on limestone hills at elevations of 500–600 m above sea level.

Nepenthes thai has no known natural hybrids.
