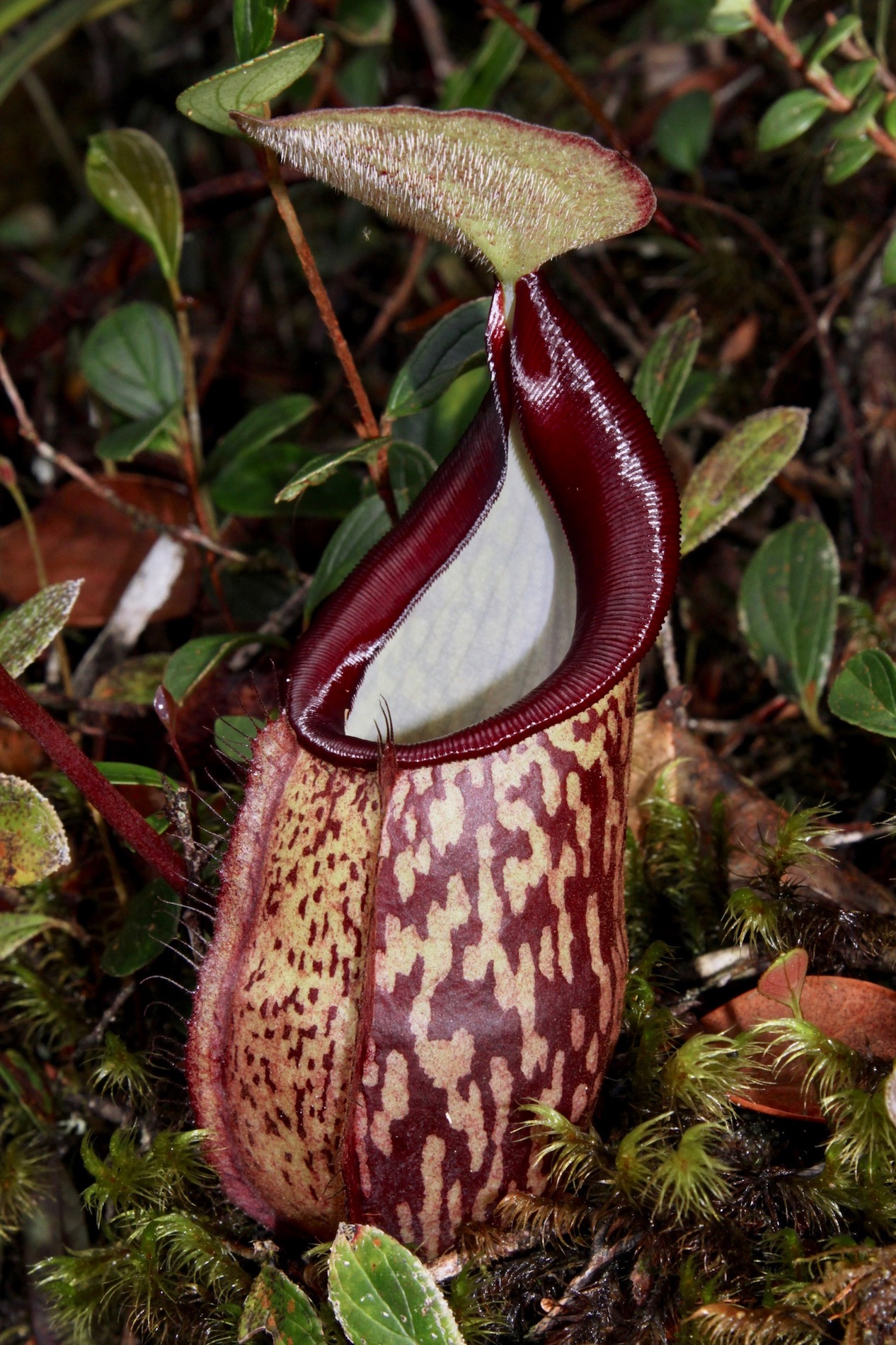
- A lower pitcher of N. macfarlanei
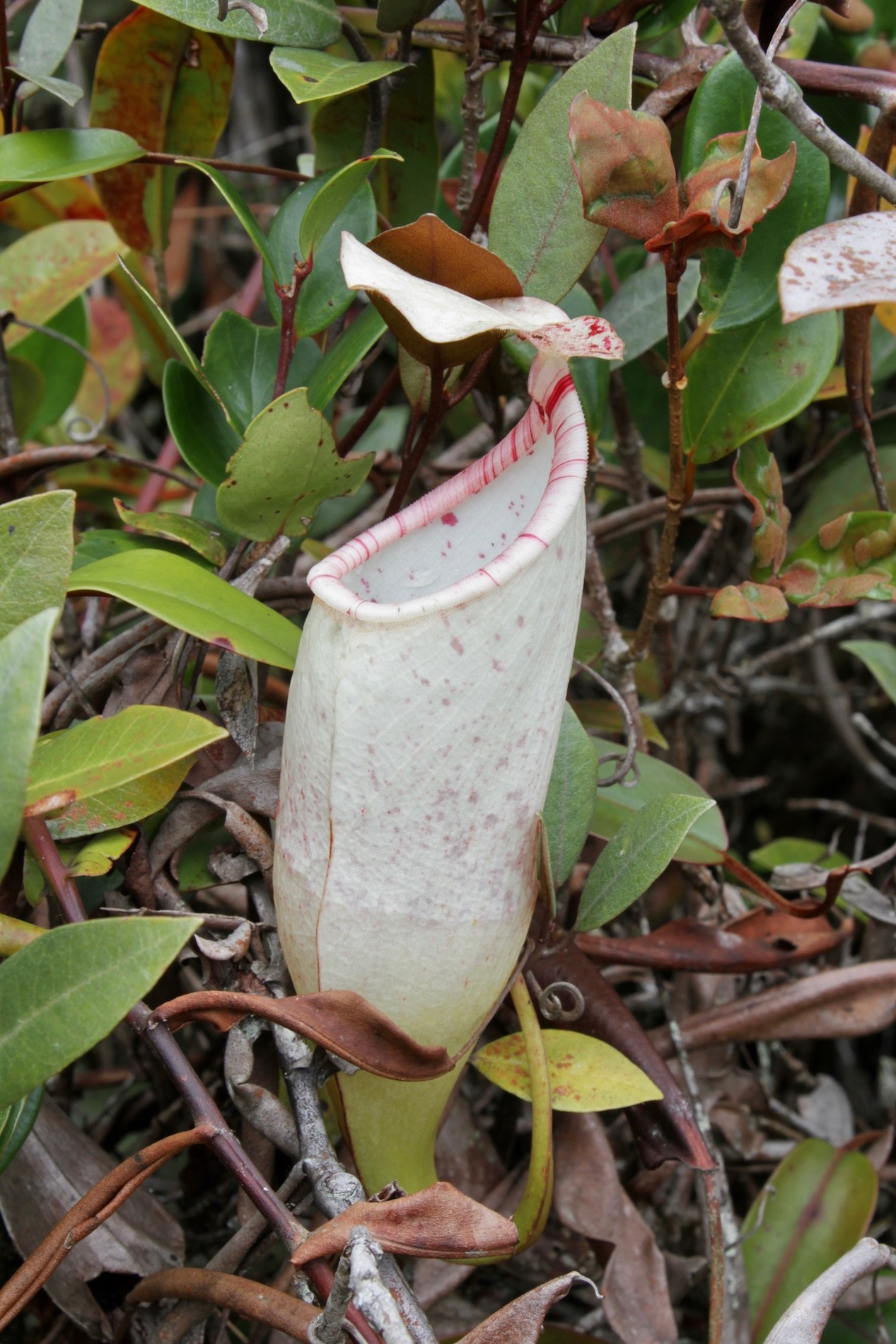
- An upper pitcher of N. macfarlanei

Conservation status
- Least Concern (IUCN 3.1)

Scientific classification
- Kingdom: Plantae
- Clade: Tracheophytes
- Clade: Angiosperms
- Clade: Eudicots
- Order: Caryophyllales
- Family: Nepenthaceae
- Genus: Nepenthes
- Species: N. macfarlanei

Binomial name
- Nepenthes macfarlanei Hemsl. (1905)

Synonyms
- Synonyms: Nepenthes gracillima auct. non Ridl.: Danser (1928); Shivas (1984) [=N. alba/N. gracillima/N. macfarlanei/N. ramispina]; Heterochresonyms: Nepenthes macfarlanei auct. non Hemsl.: Smythies (1965) [=N. lowii]

= Nepenthes macfarlanei =

Species of pitcher plant from Peninsular Malaysia

Nepenthes macfarlanei (/nɪˈpɛnθiːz ˌmækfɑːrˈleɪniaɪ/; after John Muirhead Macfarlane, botanist) is a carnivorous pitcher plant species endemic to Peninsular Malaysia. It produces attractive red-speckled pitchers. Lower pitchers are ovoid or infundibular in the lower half and globose or cylindrical above and up to 25 cm high. Upper (aerial) pitchers are of a lighter colour with wings reduced to ribs. The lower surface of the lid is densely covered with short, white hairs. This is a characteristic morphological feature of this species, but at present its function is unknown.

== Natural hybrids ==
The following natural hybrids involving N. macfarlanei have been recorded.

- N. macfarlanei × N. ramispina
- N. macfarlanei × N. sanguinea
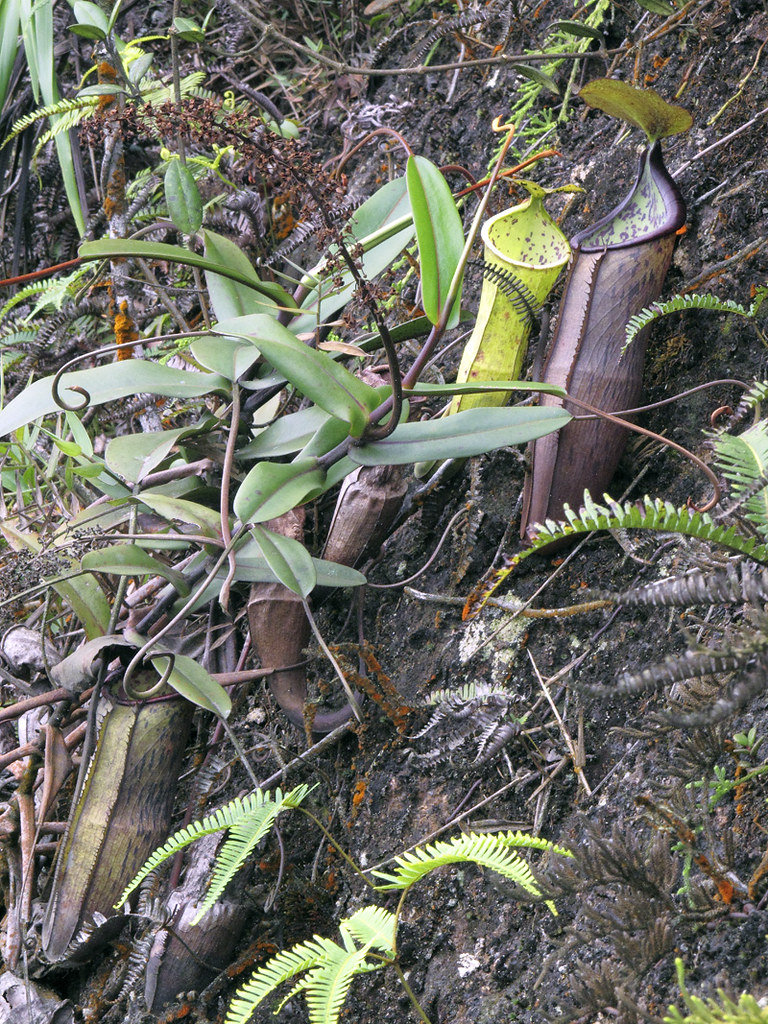
N. macfarlanei × N. ramispina

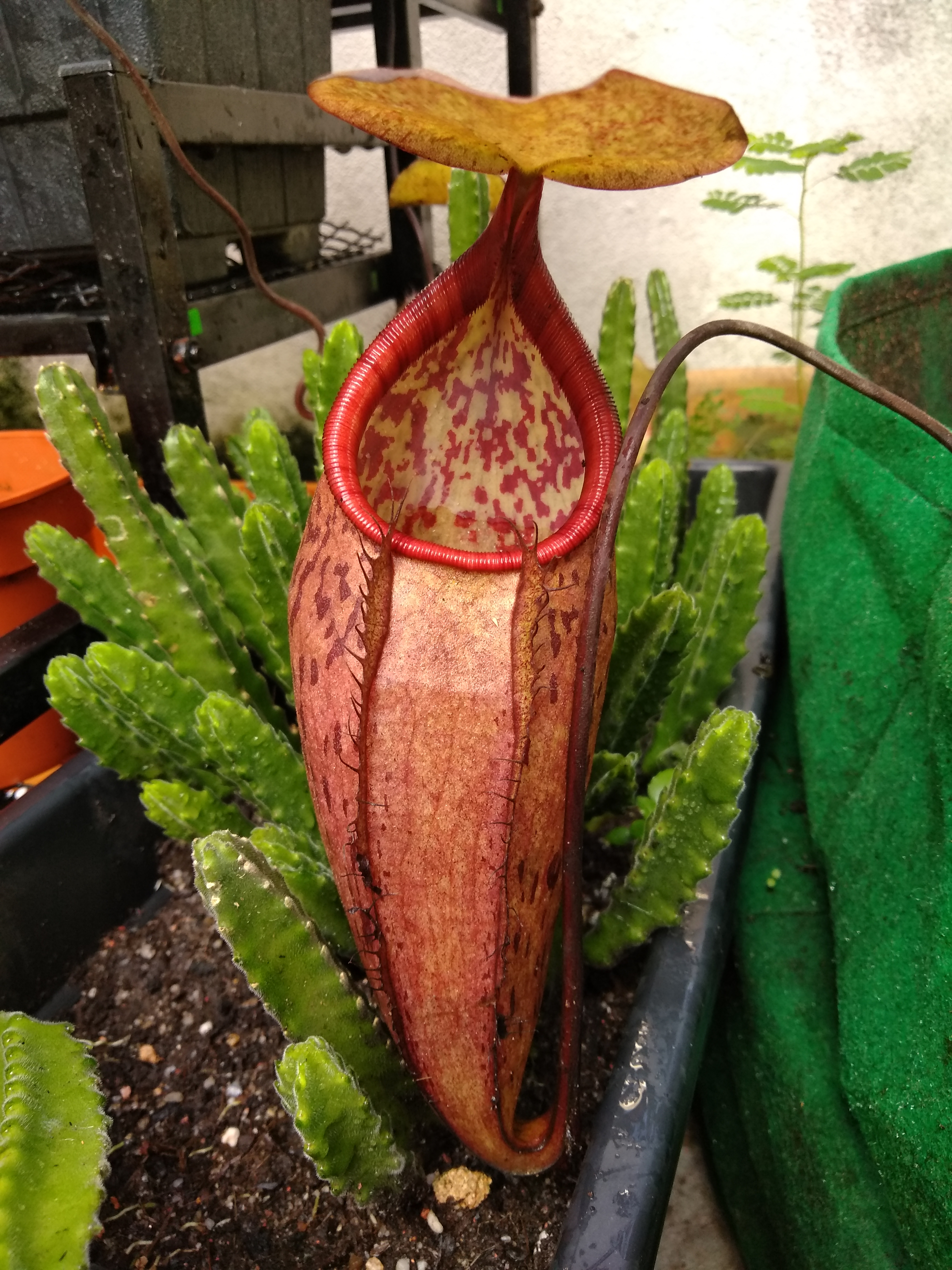
N. macfarlanei × N. sanguinea
