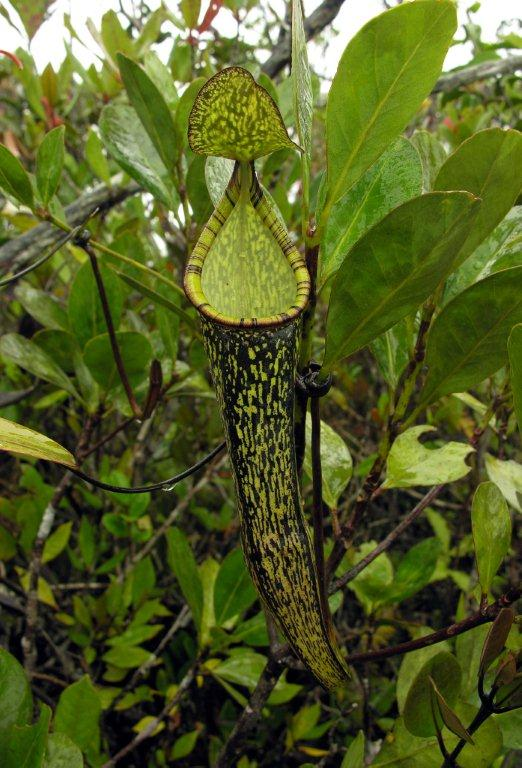
- An upper pitcher of N. gracillima from the upper slopes of Mount Tahan

Conservation status
- Least Concern (IUCN 3.1)

Scientific classification
- Kingdom: Plantae
- Clade: Tracheophytes
- Clade: Angiosperms
- Clade: Eudicots
- Order: Caryophyllales
- Family: Nepenthaceae
- Genus: Nepenthes
- Species: N. gracillima

Binomial name
- Nepenthes gracillima Ridl. (1908)

Synonyms
- Heterochresonyms: Nepenthes gracillima auct. non Ridl.: Danser (1928); Shivas (1984) [=N. alba/N. gracillima/N. macfarlanei/N. ramispina]; Nepenthes gracillima auct. non Ridl.: Smythies (1965) [=N. muluensis]; Nepenthes gracillima auct. non Ridl.: Kiew (1990); Jebb & Cheek (1997); Cheek & Jebb (2001) [=N. alba/N. benstonei/N. gracillima]; Nepenthes gracillima auct. non Ridl.: C.Clarke (2001) [=N. alba/N. gracillima]

= Nepenthes gracillima =

Species of pitcher plant from Peninsular Malaysia

Nepenthes gracillima (/nɪˈpɛnθiːz ɡrəˈsɪlɪmə/; from the Latin superlative of gracilis "slender") is a highland Nepenthes pitcher plant species, native to Peninsular Malaysia.

== Infraspecific taxa ==
- Nepenthes gracillima f. ramispina (Ridl.) Hort.Westphal (2000) [=N. ramispina]
- Nepenthes gracillima var. maior Ridl. (1924)
