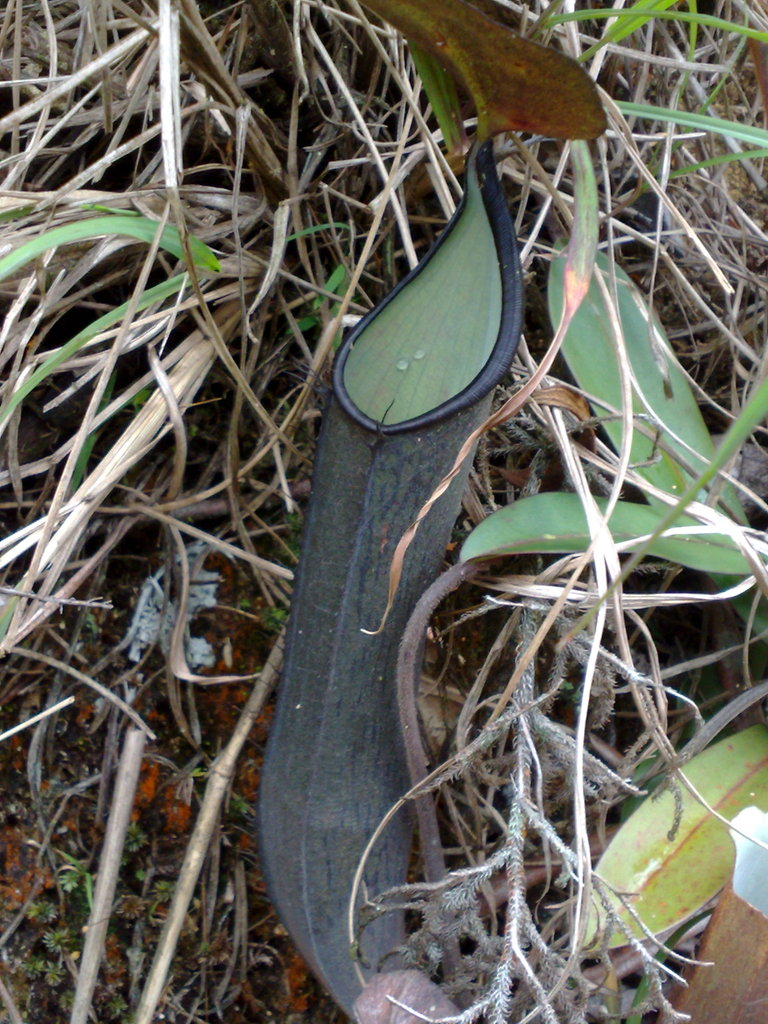
- A lower pitcher of N. ramispina

Conservation status
- Vulnerable (IUCN 2.3)

Scientific classification
- Kingdom: Plantae
- Clade: Tracheophytes
- Clade: Angiosperms
- Clade: Eudicots
- Order: Caryophyllales
- Family: Nepenthaceae
- Genus: Nepenthes
- Species: N. ramispina

Binomial name
- Nepenthes ramispina Ridl. (1909)

Synonyms
- Synonyms: Nepenthes gracillima auct. non Ridl.: Danser (1928); Shivas (1984) [=N. alba/N. gracillima/N. macfarlanei/N. ramispina]; Nepenthes gracillima f. ramispina (Ridl.) Hort.Westphal (2000)

= Nepenthes ramispina =

Species of pitcher plant from Peninsular Malaysia

Nepenthes ramispina (/nɪˈpɛnθiːz ˌræmɪˈspaɪnə/; from Latin ramus "branch" and spina "spine, spur") is a highland Nepenthes pitcher plant species, native to Peninsular Malaysia. It was once regarded as being similar to N. gracillima, but studies of the two species in nature have shown that they are readily distinguishable in isolation, N. gracillima being far more readily confused with N. macfarlanei in its rosette stage.

== Natural hybrids ==
- N. macfarlanei × N. ramispina
- N. ramispina × N. sanguinea
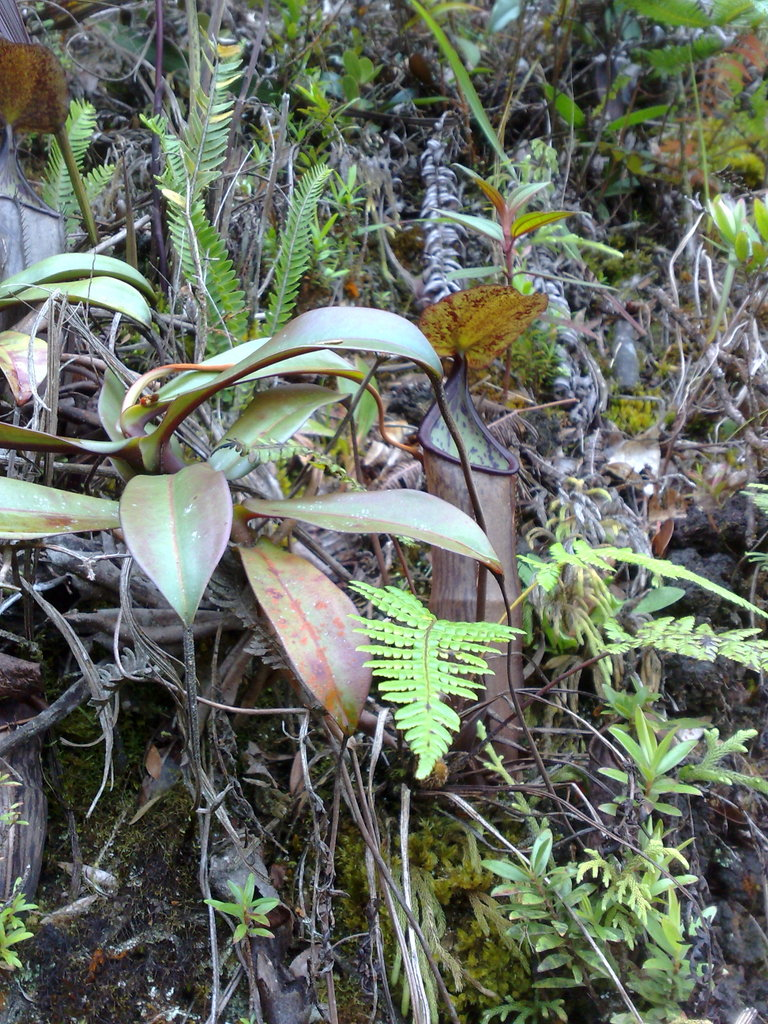
N. macfarlanei × N. ramispina
