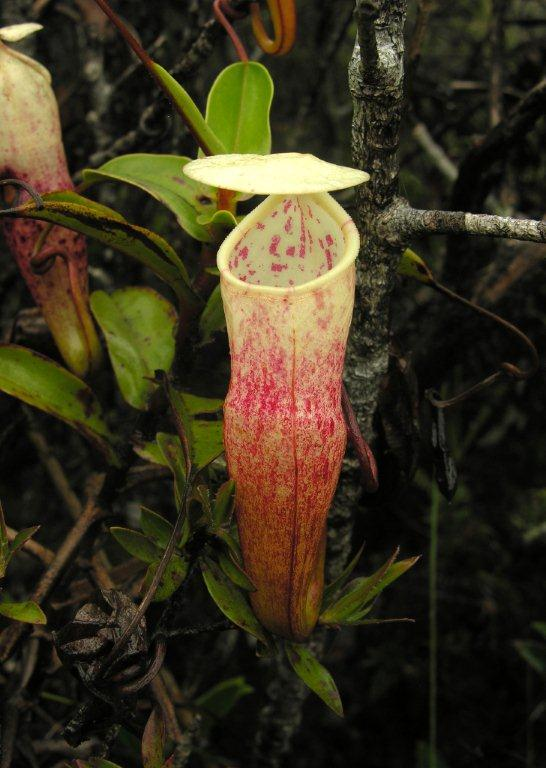
- An unusually reddish upper pitcher of N. alba growing on Mount Tahan

Conservation status
- Least Concern (IUCN 3.1)

Scientific classification
- Kingdom: Plantae
- Clade: Tracheophytes
- Clade: Angiosperms
- Clade: Eudicots
- Order: Caryophyllales
- Family: Nepenthaceae
- Genus: Nepenthes
- Species: N. alba

Binomial name
- Nepenthes alba Ridl. (1924)

Synonyms
- Synonyms: Nepenthes bongso auct. non Korth.: Ridl. (1908); Nepenthes gracillima auct. non Ridl.: Danser (1928); Shivas (1984) [=N. alba/N. gracillima/N. macfarlanei/N. ramispina]; Nepenthes gracillima auct. non Ridl.: Kiew (1990); Jebb & Cheek (1997); Cheek & Jebb (2001) [=N. alba/N. benstonei/N. gracillima]; Nepenthes gracillima auct. non Ridl.: C.Clarke (2001) [=N. alba/N. gracillima]; Nepenthes singalana auct. non Becc.: Macfarl. (1908) [=N. alba/N. singalana]; Nepenthes singalana auct. non Becc.: Macfarl. (1914)

= Nepenthes alba =

Species of pitcher plant from Peninsular Malaysia

Nepenthes alba is a tropical pitcher plant endemic to Peninsular Malaysia. The specific epithet alba is derived from the Latin word albus, meaning "white", and refers to the colour of the upper pitchers.
