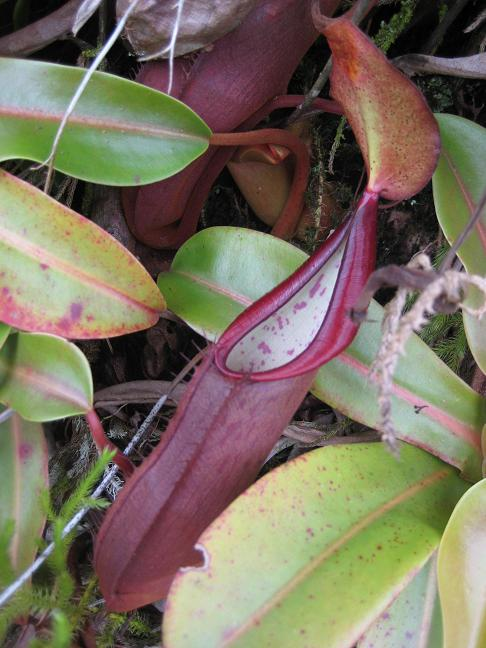
- A lower pitcher of Nepenthes sanguinea

Conservation status
- Least Concern (IUCN 3.1)

Scientific classification
- Kingdom: Plantae
- Clade: Tracheophytes
- Clade: Angiosperms
- Clade: Eudicots
- Order: Caryophyllales
- Family: Nepenthaceae
- Genus: Nepenthes
- Species: N. sanguinea

Binomial name
- Nepenthes sanguinea Lindl. (1849)

Synonyms
- Synonyms: Nepenthes pumila Griff. (1854); Heterochresonyms: Nepenthes sanguinea auct. non Lindl.: Mast. (1882) [=N. veitchii]; Nepenthes sanguinea auct. non Lindl.: Jebb & Cheek (1997) [=N. benstonei/N. sanguinea]

= Nepenthes sanguinea =

Species of pitcher plant from Thailand and Peninsular Malaysia

Nepenthes sanguinea (/nɪˈpɛnθiːz sæŋˈɡwɪniə/; from Latin sanguineus "blood red") is a large and vigorous Nepenthes pitcher plant species, native to Peninsular Malaysia and southernmost Thailand, where it grows at 300–1,800 metres (1,000 to 6,000 feet) altitude. It is primarily a terrestrial species, but can grow as an epiphyte in the wet biome of upper montane forests. The pitchers are variable in size, from 10–30 cm (4 to 12 inches) tall, and range from green and yellow to orange and red. The insides of the pitchers are usually speckled with its two main colors. It was introduced to Victorian Britain around 1847 by Cornish plant hunter and botanist Thomas Lobb via the Veitch Nurseries.

== Natural hybrids ==
- ? N. albomarginata × N. sanguinea
- N. macfarlanei × N. sanguinea
- N. ramispina × N. sanguinea
