= Acacia-ant symbiosis =

Type of symbiosis

Acacia-ant symbiosis is the interaction between myrmecophilous Vachellia trees (ant acacias) and ants that nest on them (acacia ants). Obligate acacia ants dwell in the gall-like domatia within the swollen stipular spines of African or Central American ant acacia species, and they also take the food (nectar or Beltian bodies) offered by the tree. Some of them protect ant acacias from herbivores in return, hence mutualism; the others provide inadequate protection or none at all, hence weaker or non-mutualism. Facultative (non-obligate) acacia ants often nest on stems instead of in gall-like domatia, and tend to be non-mutualistic.

== Africa ==
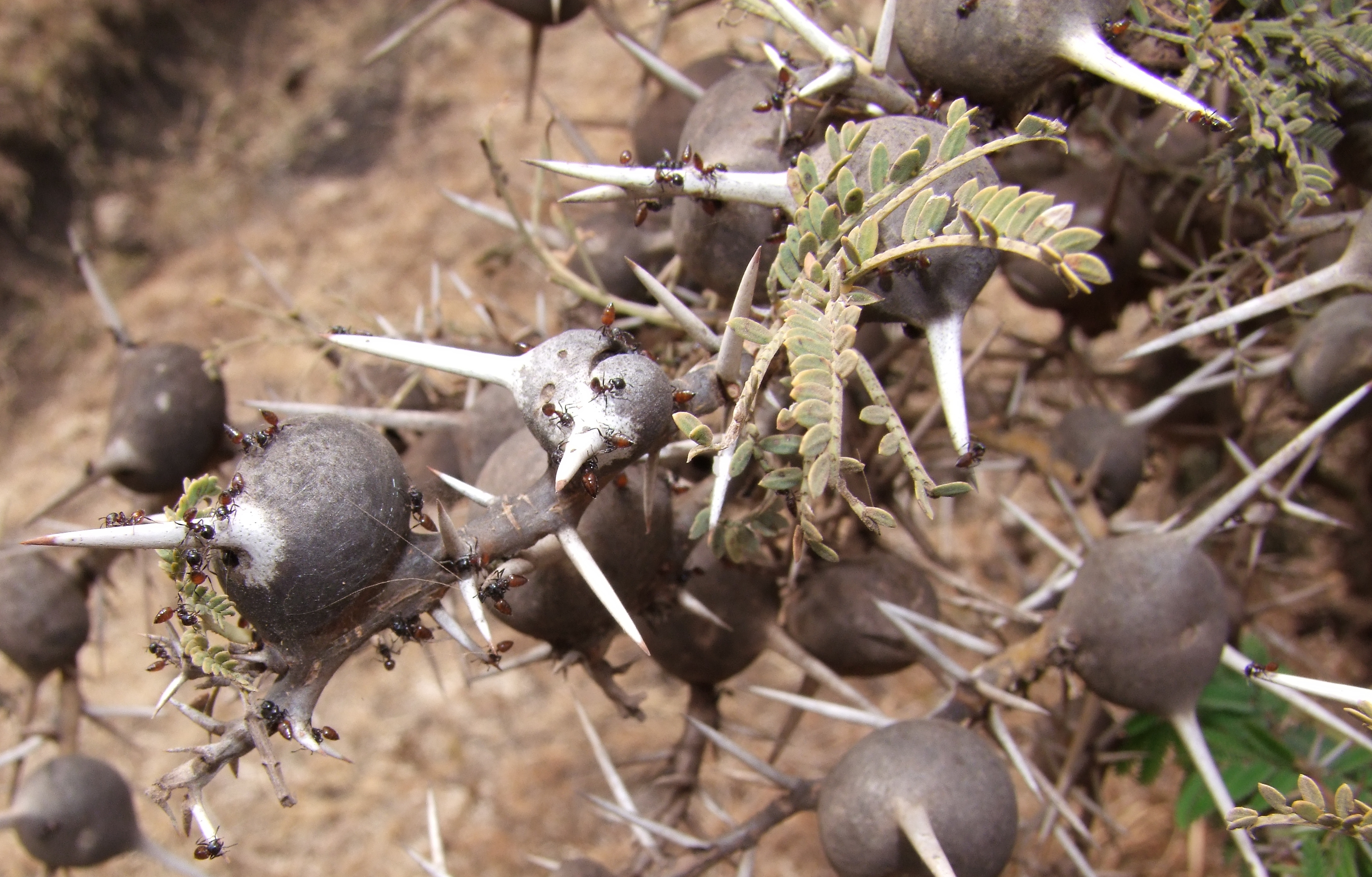
Crematogaster nigriceps living in the gall-like domatia of Vachellia drepanolobium

Four acacia ant species are symbiotic with Vachellia drepanolobium: Crematogaster mimosae, C. nigriceps, and Tetraponera penzigi are obligate and mutualistic symbionts, whereas C. sjostedti is facultative and the least mutualistic, and it even facilitates attack on the tree by beetles.

Vachellia bullockii, V. burttii, V. bussei, V. elatior, V. erioloba, V. erythrophloea, V. luederitzii var. retinens, V. malacocephala, V. mbuluensis, V. myrmecophila, V. pseudofistula, V. seyal var. fistula, and V. zanzibarica are also known to have gall-like domatia, but their symbiotic ants are yet to be studied.

== Central America ==
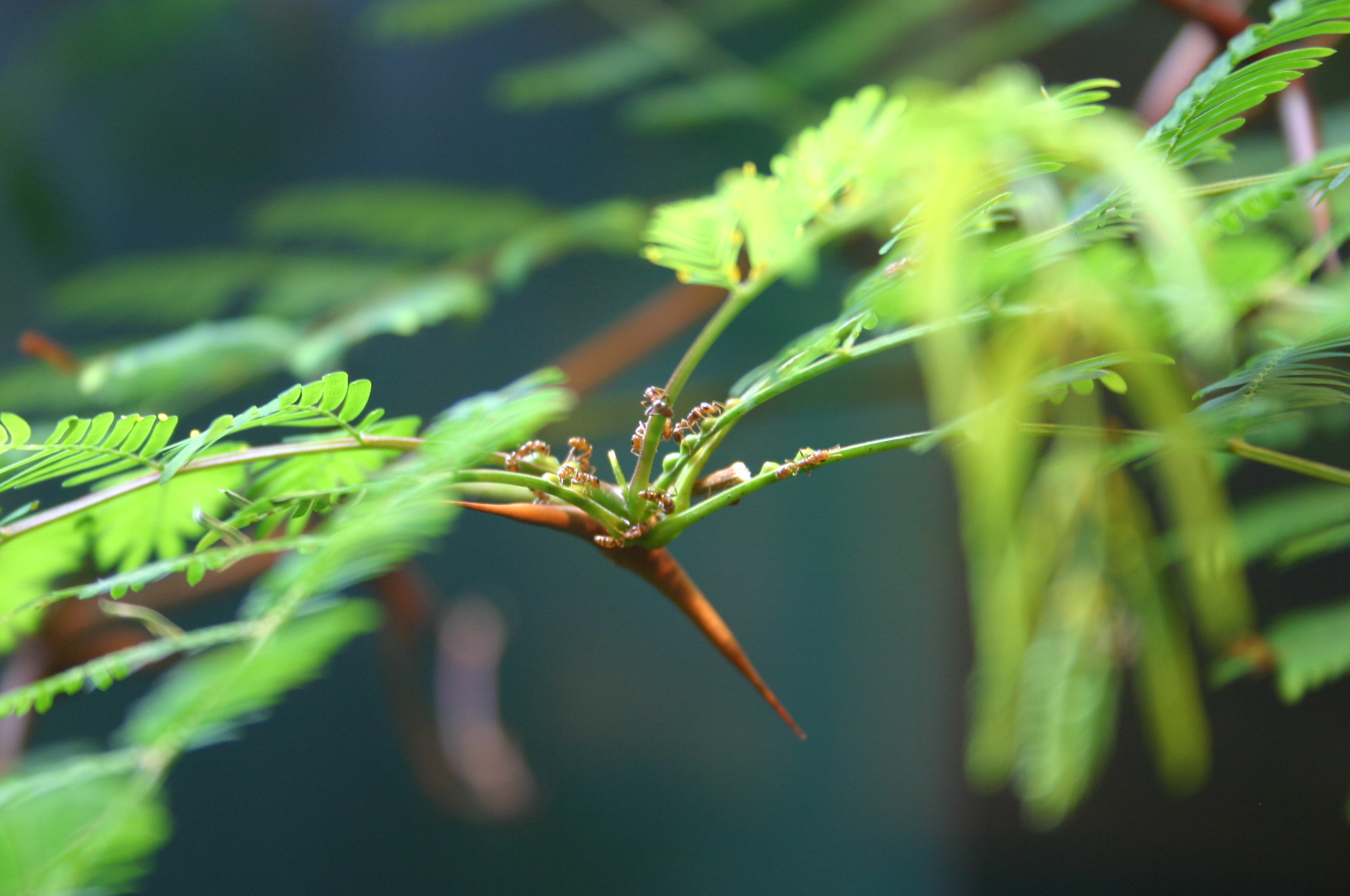
Pseudomyrmex ferruginea feeding on nectar produced by Vachellia cornigera (or V. sphaerocephala)

The following are 10 obligate and mutualistic acacia ants and their reported host plants in Central America:

- Pseudomyrmex ferruginea: Vachellia allenii, V. chiapensis, V. collinsii, V. cookii, V. cornigera, V. gentlei, V. globulifera, V. hindsii, V. janzenii, V. mayana, and V. sphaerocephala
- P. flavicornis and P. nigrocinctus: V. collinsii, V. cornigera, and V. hindsii
- P. janzeni: V. hindsii
- P. mixtecus and P. veneficus: V. collinsii and V. hindsii
- P. particeps: V. allenii
- P. peperi: V. chiapensis, V. collinsii, V. cornigera, V. gentlei, V. globulifera, and V. hindsii
- P. satanicus: V. melanoceras
- P. spinicola: V. collinsii, V. cornigera, and V. allenii

The obligate acacia ant with weak or non-mutualism include P. nigropilosus, P. simulans and P. subtilissimus.

Facultative acacia ants in Central America include P. boopis, P. gracilis, P. hesperius, P. ita, P. kuenckeli, P. opaciceps, Crematogaster and Camponotus species.

Some swollen-spine acacias in Central America are less dependent on acacia-ant mutualism and often unocuppied by obligate acacia ants without being significantly damaged by herbivores, e.g. V. cookii, V. globulifera, and V. ruddiae.
