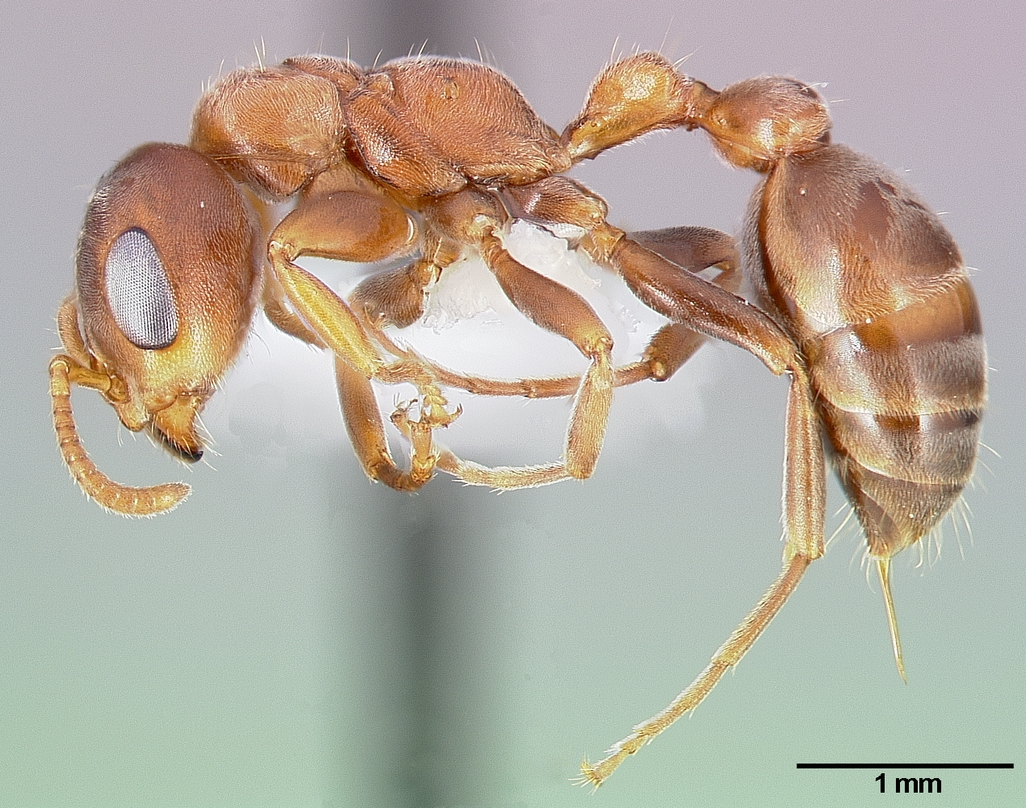
- Worker

Scientific classification
- Domain: Eukaryota
- Kingdom: Animalia
- Phylum: Arthropoda
- Class: Insecta
- Order: Hymenoptera
- Family: Formicidae
- Genus: Pseudomyrmex
- Species: P. ferruginea

Binomial name
- Pseudomyrmex ferruginea F. Smith, 1877

= Pseudomyrmex ferruginea =

Species of ant

The acacia ant (Pseudomyrmex ferruginea) is a species of ant of the genus Pseudomyrmex. These arboreal, wasp-like ants have an orange-brown body around 3 mm in length and very large eyes. The acacia ant is best known and named for living in symbiosis with the bullhorn acacia (Acacia cornigera) throughout Central America.

The ant and the acacia exemplify a coevolution of a mutualistic system, as described by evolutionary ecologist Daniel Janzen.

== Description ==
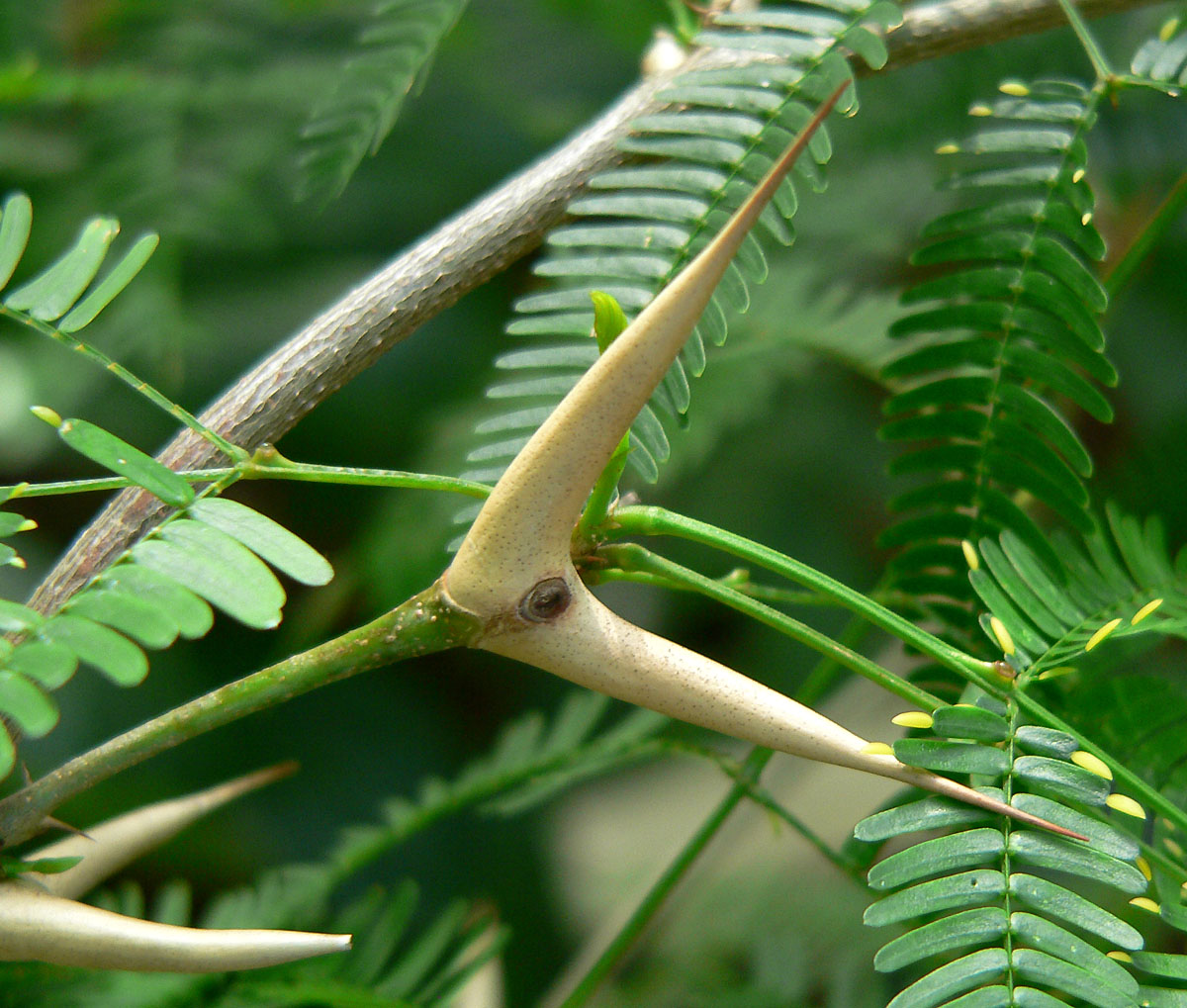
"Horns" of Acacia cornigera

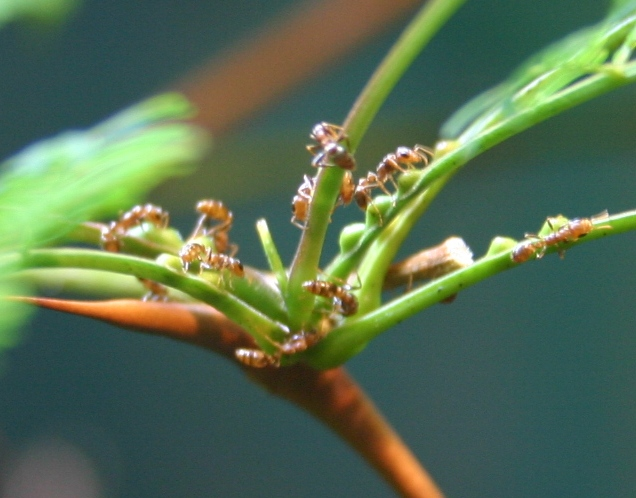

P. ferruginea is an obligate plant ant that occupies at least five species of acacia (A. chiapensis, A. collinsii, A. cornigera, A. hindsii and A. sphaerocephala). Its life cycle conforms to the claustral pattern of ants in general.

=== Mutualistic symbiosis ===
To repel herbivorous animals, various acacias protect their succulent leaves with one of several methods, including vicious-looking spines, repellent, noxious chemicals, and—as is the case with the bullhorn acacia—by developing a mutualism with the acacia ant.

The symbiotic relationship begins when a newly mated queen is attracted by the odour from the tree and starts nesting inside the large hollow acacia thorns. The queen nibbles into the thorn to lay 15–20 eggs to produce the first generation of workers. As the colony grows, more of the bulbous thorns get inhabited, and when the colony reaches some 400 individuals the ants start to act as gardeners.

When the host plant is damaged by e.g. an herbivore, the damaged leaves release volatile organic compounds. When the ants perceive one of these compounds, trans-2-hexenal, they aggressively swarm to the damaged leaf and attack creatures of all sizes attracted by the acacia leaves, killing insects such as crickets and stinging the mouths and tongues of mammals such as goats. Even other plants such as epiphytic vines are repelled and as little as an unfamiliar odour can cause the ants to swarm toward the potential threat. Additionally, the ants scout the ground around the tree for seedlings and destroy any competitors they find. In compensation, special glands at the base of the tree's leaves produce a nectar rich in sugar and amino acids, and the tips of the leaves sprout Beltian bodies, small nutritious packets of oils and proteins. However, not all is mutually beneficial: the ants relish the sweet honeydew produced by scale insects which suck the sap of the acacia and therefore protect them as well, effectively providing entry to diseases.

The development of myrmecophytism ("ant symbiosis") and spininess in African and New World acacia species was an adaptation to the presence of large faunas of effective browsing mammals. The ants' sting is very painful, causing a lasting burning and throbbing effect. The ants provide vital protection to the bullhorn acacias day and night, and it has been shown that without the ants, Acacia cornigera suffer greater damage from attacking insects and tend to be overgrown by competing plant species.

=== Life cycle ===
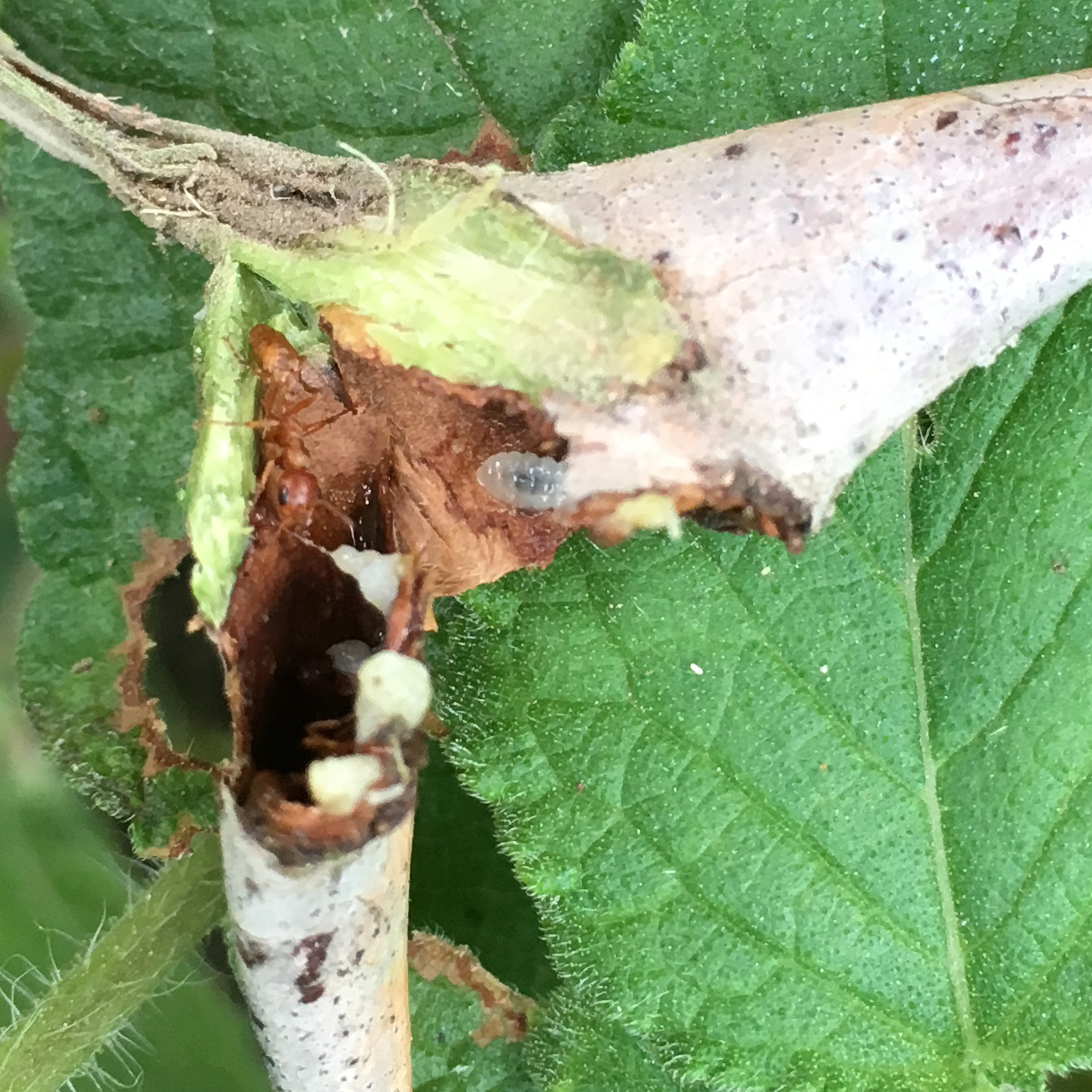
An opened A. cornigera thorn containing an adult and immature P. ferruginea

Nuptial flight occurs in warm weather at any time of the year. If an acacia thorn has not been opened by a previous occupant, the queen gnaws a circular hole to enter the thorn cavity. She lays 15 to 20 eggs and rears her first brood while remaining secluded inside the thorn. The population of the colony then increases to 150 workers within seven months, to 300 three months later, to 1,100 in two years, and to over 4,000 in three years.

In young colonies workers leave the protective thorns to collect nectar and Beltian bodies, but only as long as necessary. At rare intervals they leave their thorns to occupy new ones. Males and virgin queens are produced during the second year. As the number of ants reaches 50–100, workers start patrolling the open plant surface next to their home thorn, and as the population reaches 200–400, workers become more aggressive and attack other smaller nearby colonies, ward off phytophagous insects that make landing attempts near the thorn more effectively.

In old colonies the queen is physogastric (i.e. has a swollen, membranous abdomen), heavily attended by workers, and accompanied by hundreds of eggs and young larvae.

=== Larvae ===
The larvae are fed on unaltered fragments of Beltian bodies that are pushed deep into the larva's food pouch (the trophothylax, a pocket just behind the mouth). The larva then starts to rotate its head in and out of the pouch to chew the contents, while ejecting droplets of clear fluid possibly containing digestive enzyme into the pouch.

Fragments that protrude from the pouch are removed by a worker and redistributed. Regularly, workers force open the pouch to regurgitate droplets of fluid into it. The nature of this fluid is uncertain. It is possible captured insects constitute a secondary source of nutrition to the larvae.

== Uses ==
In traditional Maya medicine, acacia ants are used to treat depression by forcing an ant to bite a vein several times, usually in the crook of the elbow. The ants can also be crushed to form an oil which is applied to the chest to treat asthma.

== See also ==
- List of symbiotic relationships
- Acacia collinsii
- Myrmelachista schumanni
- Myrmecodia
