= Coevolution =

Two or more species influencing each other's evolution

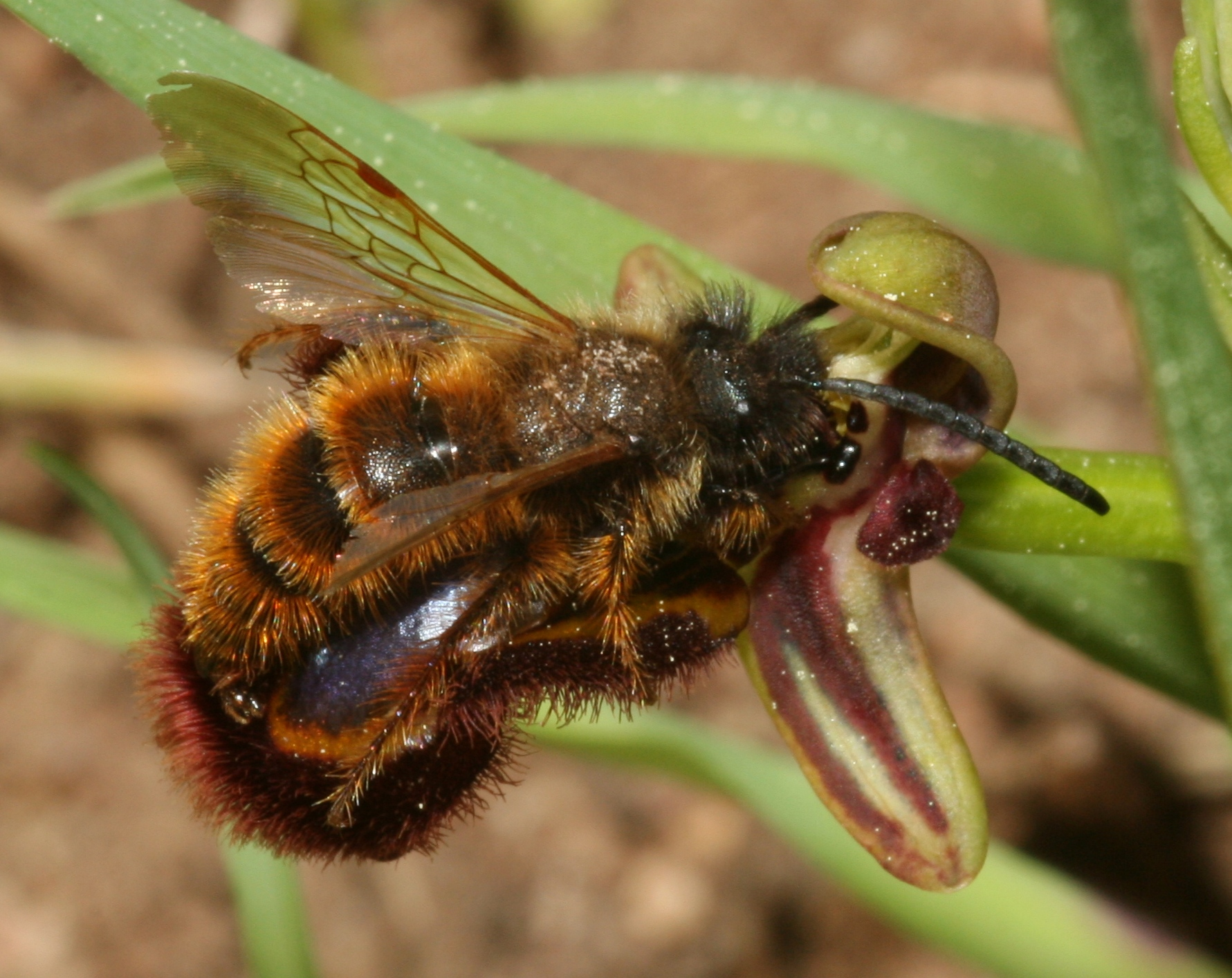
The pollinating wasp Dasyscolia ciliata in pseudocopulation with a flower of Ophrys speculum

In biology, coevolution occurs when two or more species reciprocally affect each other's evolution through the process of natural selection. The term sometimes is used for two traits in the same species affecting each other's evolution, as well as gene-culture coevolution.

Charles Darwin mentioned evolutionary interactions between flowering plants and insects in On the Origin of Species (1859). He used the similar word coadaptation and suggested how plants and insects could evolve through reciprocal evolutionary changes. Naturalists in the late 1800s studied other examples of how interactions among species could result in reciprocal evolutionary change. Beginning in the 1940s, plant pathologists developed breeding programs that were examples of human-induced coevolution. Development of new crop plant varieties that were resistant to some diseases favored rapid evolution in pathogen populations to overcome those plant defenses. That, in turn, required the development of yet new resistant crop plant varieties, producing an ongoing cycle of reciprocal evolution in crop plants and diseases that continues to this day.

Coevolution as a major topic for study in nature expanded rapidly from the 1960s, when Daniel H. Janzen showed coevolution between acacias and ants (see below) and Paul R. Ehrlich and Peter H. Raven suggested how coevolution between plants and butterflies may have contributed to the diversification of species in both groups. The theoretical underpinnings of coevolution are now well-developed (e.g., the geographic mosaic theory of coevolution), and demonstrate that coevolution can play an important role in driving major evolutionary transitions such as the evolution of sexual reproduction or shifts in ploidy. More recently, it has also been demonstrated that coevolution can influence the structure and function of ecological communities, the evolution of groups of mutualists such as plants and their pollinators, and the dynamics of infectious disease.

Each party in a coevolutionary relationship exerts selective pressures on the other, thereby affecting each other's evolution. Coevolution includes many forms of mutualism, host-parasite, and predator-prey relationships between species, as well as competition within or between species. In many cases, the selective pressures drive an evolutionary arms race between the species involved. Pairwise or specific coevolution, between exactly two species, is not the only possibility; in multi-species coevolution, which is sometimes called guild or diffuse coevolution, several to many species may evolve a trait or a group of traits in reciprocity with a set of traits in another species, as has happened between the flowering plants and pollinating insects such as bees, flies, and beetles. There are a suite of specific hypotheses on the mechanisms by which groups of species coevolve with each other.

Coevolution is primarily a biological concept, but researchers have applied it by analogy to fields such as computer science, sociology, and astronomy.

== Mutualism ==
Coevolution is the evolution of two or more species which reciprocally affect each other, sometimes creating a mutualistic relationship between the species. Such relationships can be of many different types.

=== Flowering plants ===
Flowering plants appeared and diversified relatively suddenly in the fossil record, creating what Charles Darwin described as the "abominable mystery" of how flowers had evolved so quickly; he considered whether coevolution could be the explanation. He first mentioned coevolution as a possibility in On the Origin of Species, and developed the concept further in Fertilisation of Orchids (1862).

==== Insects and insect-pollinated flowers ====
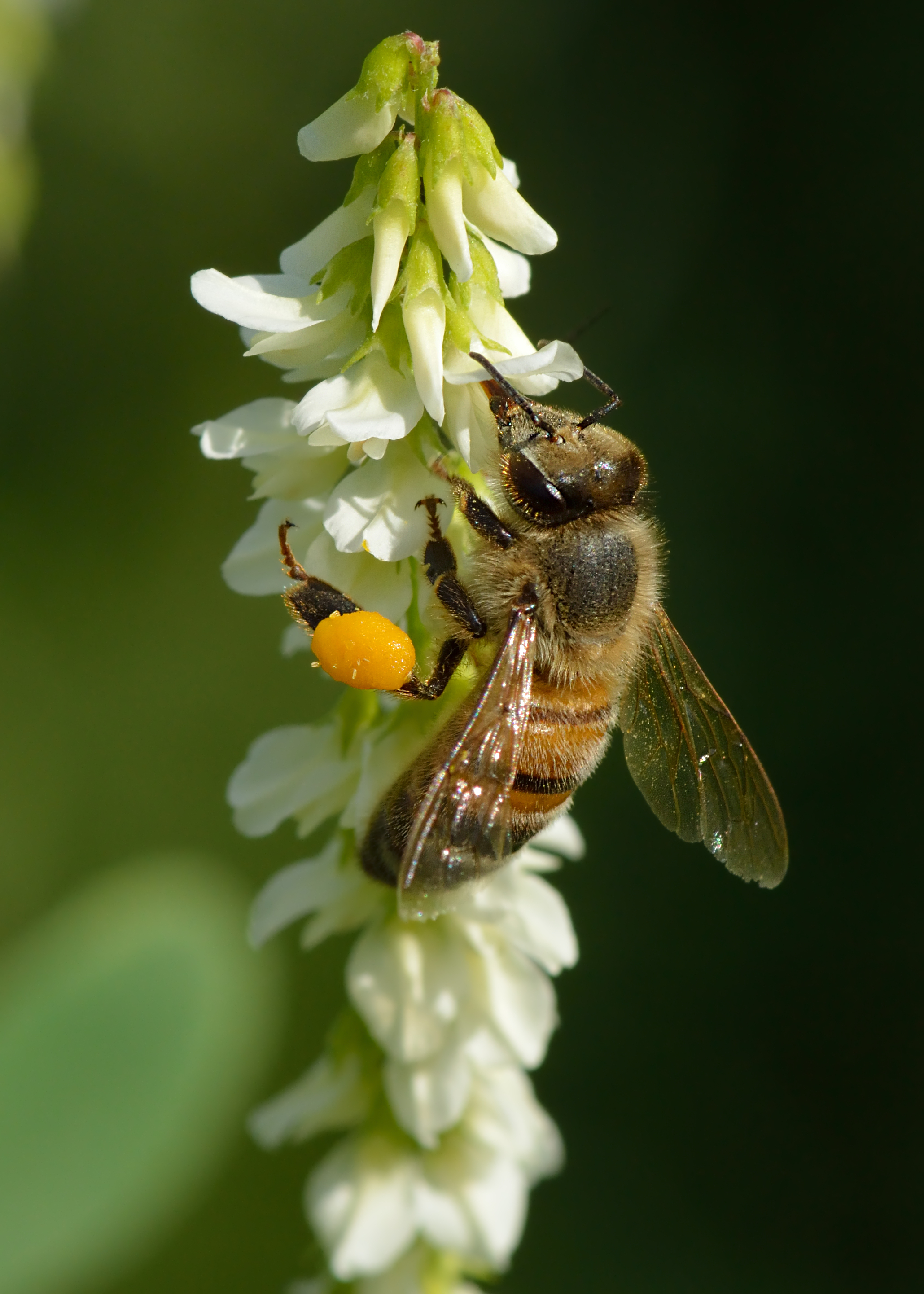
Honey bee taking a reward of nectar and collecting pollen in its pollen baskets from white melilot flowers

Modern insect-pollinated (entomophilous) flowers are conspicuously coadapted with insects to ensure pollination and in return to reward the pollinators with nectar and pollen. The two groups have coevolved for over 100 million years, creating a complex network of interactions. Either they evolved together, or at some later stages they came together, likely with pre-adaptations, and became mutually adapted.

Several highly successful insect groups—especially the Hymenoptera (wasps, bees and ants) and Lepidoptera (butterflies and moths) as well as many types of Diptera (flies) and Coleoptera (beetles)—evolved in conjunction with flowering plants during the Cretaceous (145 to 66 million years ago). The earliest bees, important pollinators today, appeared in the early Cretaceous. A group of wasps sister to the bees evolved at the same time as flowering plants, as did the Lepidoptera. Further, all the major clades of bees first appeared between the middle and late Cretaceous, simultaneously with the adaptive radiation of the eudicots (three quarters of all angiosperms), and at the time when the angiosperms became the world's dominant plants on land.

At least three aspects of flowers appear to have coevolved between flowering plants and insects, because they involve communication between these organisms. Firstly, flowers communicate with their pollinators by scent; insects use this scent to determine how far away a flower is, to approach it, and to identify where to land and finally to feed. Secondly, flowers attract insects with patterns of stripes leading to the rewards of nectar and pollen, and colours such as blue and ultraviolet, to which their eyes are sensitive; in contrast, bird-pollinated flowers tend to be red or orange. Thirdly, flowers such as some orchids mimic females of particular insects, deceiving males into pseudocopulation.

The yucca, Yucca whipplei, is pollinated exclusively by Tegeticula maculata, a yucca moth that depends on the yucca for survival. The moth eats the seeds of the plant, while gathering pollen. The pollen has evolved to become very sticky, and remains on the mouth parts when the moth moves to the next flower. The yucca provides a place for the moth to lay its eggs, deep within the flower away from potential predators.

==== Birds and bird-pollinated flowers ====
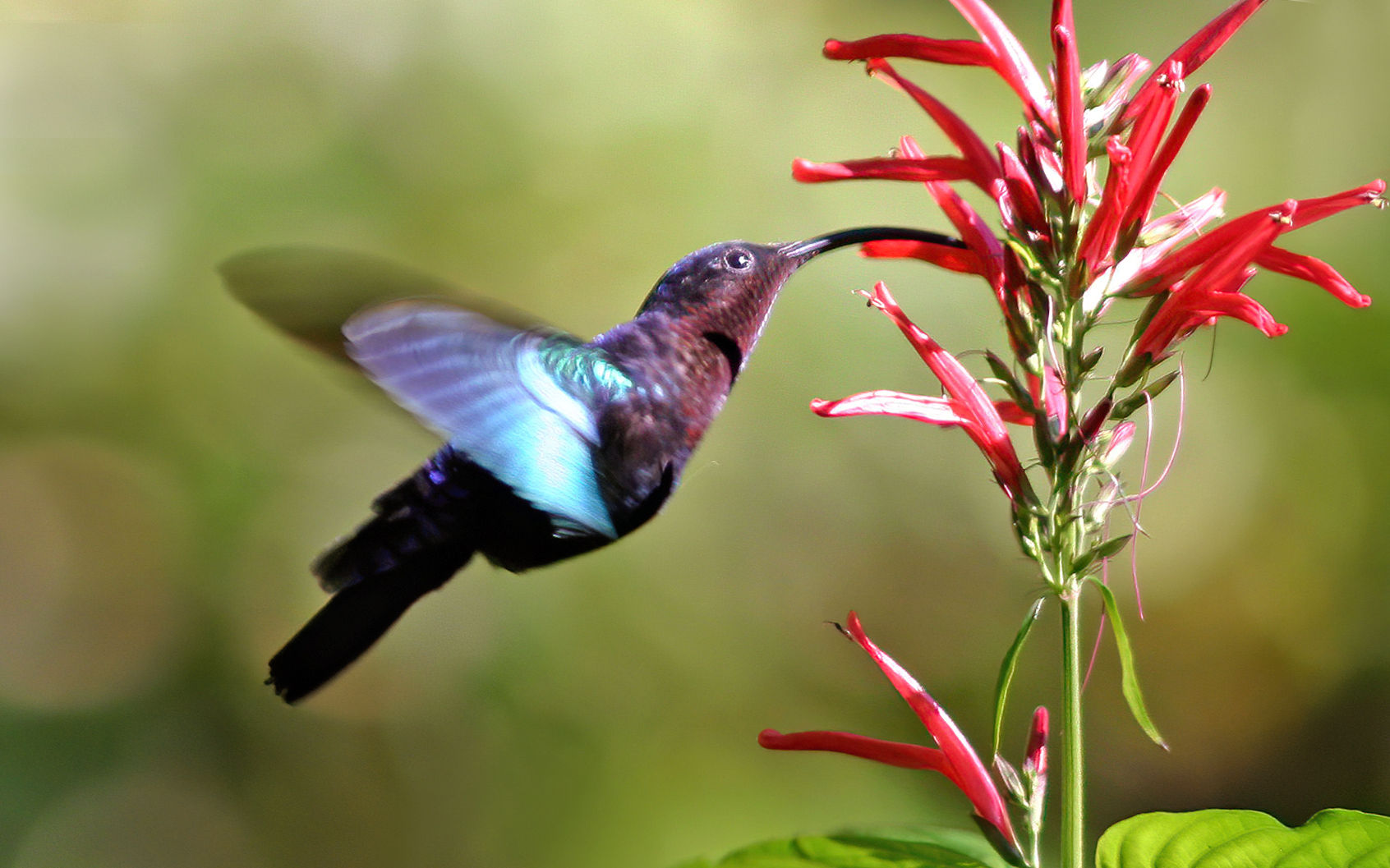
Purple-throated carib feeding from and pollinating a flower

Hummingbirds and ornithophilous (bird-pollinated) flowers have evolved a mutualistic relationship. The flowers have nectar suited to the birds' diet, their color suits the birds' vision and their shape fits that of the birds' bills. The blooming times of the flowers have also been found to coincide with hummingbirds' breeding seasons. The floral characteristics of ornithophilous plants vary greatly among each other compared to closely related insect-pollinated species. These flowers also tend to be more ornate, complex, and showy than their insect pollinated counterparts. It is generally agreed that plants formed coevolutionary relationships with insects first, and ornithophilous species diverged at a later time. There is not much scientific support for instances of the reverse of this divergence: from ornithophily to insect pollination. The diversity in floral phenotype in ornithophilous species, and the relative consistency observed in bee-pollinated species can be attributed to the direction of the shift in pollinator preference.

Flowers have converged to take advantage of similar birds. Flowers compete for pollinators, and adaptations reduce unfavourable effects of this competition. The fact that birds can fly during inclement weather makes them more efficient pollinators where bees and other insects would be inactive. Ornithophily may have arisen for this reason in isolated environments with poor insect colonization or areas with plants which flower in the winter. Bird-pollinated flowers usually have higher volumes of nectar and higher sugar production than those pollinated by insects. This meets the birds' high energy requirements, the most important determinants of flower choice. In Mimulus, an increase in red pigment in petals and flower nectar volume noticeably reduces the proportion of pollination by bees as opposed to hummingbirds; while greater flower surface area increases bee pollination. Therefore, red pigments in the flowers of Mimulus cardinalis may function primarily to discourage bee visitation. In Penstemon, flower traits that discourage bee pollination may be more influential on the flowers' evolutionary change than 'pro-bird' adaptations, but adaptation 'towards' birds and 'away' from bees can happen simultaneously. However, some flowers such as Heliconia angusta appear not to be as specifically ornithophilous as had been supposed: the species is occasionally (151 visits in 120 hours of observation) visited by Trigona stingless bees. These bees are largely pollen robbers in this case, but may also serve as pollinators.

Following their respective breeding seasons, several species of hummingbirds occur at the same locations in North America, and several hummingbird flowers bloom simultaneously in these habitats. These flowers have converged to a common morphology and color because these are effective at attracting the birds. Different lengths and curvatures of the corolla tubes can affect the efficiency of extraction in hummingbird species in relation to differences in bill morphology. Tubular flowers force a bird to orient its bill in a particular way when probing the flower, especially when the bill and corolla are both curved. This allows the plant to place pollen on a certain part of the bird's body, permitting a variety of morphological co-adaptations.

Ornithophilous flowers need to be conspicuous to birds. Birds have their greatest spectral sensitivity and finest hue discrimination at the red end of the visual spectrum, so red is particularly conspicuous to them. Hummingbirds may also be able to see ultraviolet "colors". The prevalence of ultraviolet patterns and nectar guides in nectar-poor entomophilous (insect-pollinated) flowers warns the bird to avoid these flowers. Each of the two subfamilies of hummingbirds, the Phaethornithinae (hermits) and the Trochilinae, has evolved in conjunction with a particular set of flowers. Most Phaethornithinae species are associated with large monocotyledonous herbs, while the Trochilinae prefer dicotyledonous plant species.

=== Fig reproduction and fig wasps ===
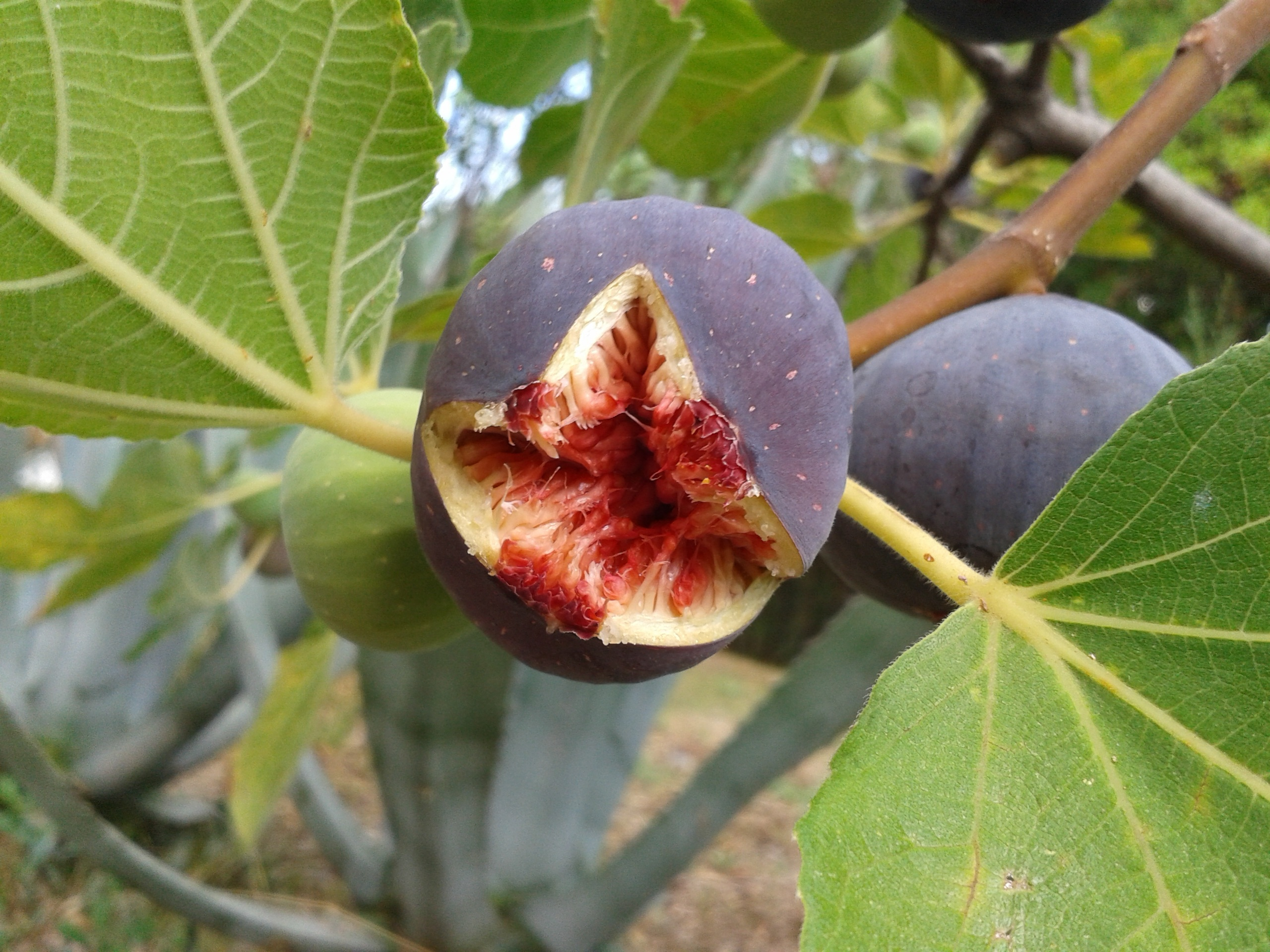
A fig exposing its many tiny matured, seed-bearing gynoecia. These are pollinated by the fig wasp, Blastophaga psenes. In the cultivated fig, there are also asexual varieties.

The genus Ficus is composed of 800 species of vines, shrubs, and trees, including the cultivated fig, defined by their syconia, the fruit-like vessels that either hold female flowers or pollen on the inside. Each fig species has its own fig wasp which (in most cases) pollinates the fig, so a tight mutual dependence has evolved and persisted throughout the genus.

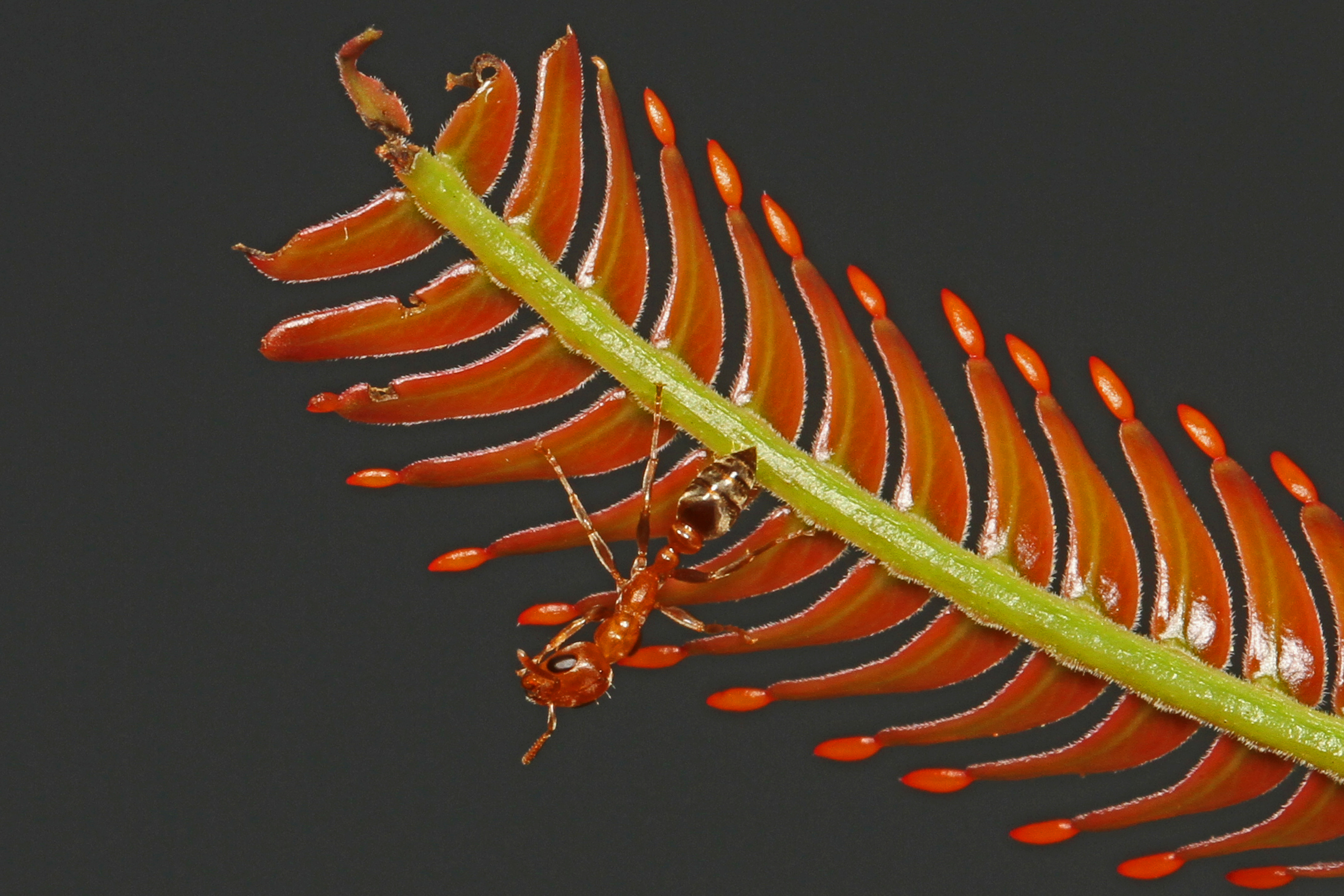
Pseudomyrmex ant on bull thorn acacia (Vachellia cornigera) with Beltian bodies that provide the ants with protein

=== Acacia ants and acacias ===
The acacia ant (Pseudomyrmex ferruginea) is an obligate plant ant that protects at least five species of "Acacia" (Vachellia) (Note: The acacia ant protects at least 5 species of "Acacia", now all renamed to Vachellia: V. chiapensis, V. collinsii, V. cornigera, V. hindsii, and V. sphaerocephala.) from preying insects and from other plants competing for sunlight, and the tree provides nourishment and shelter for the ant and its larvae. Such mutualism is not automatic: other ant species exploit trees without reciprocating, following different evolutionary strategies. These cheater ants impose important host costs via damage to tree reproductive organs, though their net effect on host fitness is not necessarily negative and, thus, becomes difficult to forecast.

== Hosts and parasites ==
=== Parasites and sexually reproducing hosts ===
Host–parasite coevolution is the coevolution of a host and a parasite. A general characteristic of many viruses, as obligate parasites, is that they coevolved alongside their respective hosts. Correlated mutations between the two species enter them into an evolution arms race. Whichever organism, host or parasite, that cannot keep up with the other will be eliminated from their habitat, as the species with the higher average population fitness survives. This race is known as the Red Queen hypothesis. The Red Queen hypothesis predicts that sexual reproduction allows a host to stay just ahead of its parasite, similar to the Red Queen's race in Through the Looking-Glass: "it takes all the running you can do, to keep in the same place". The host reproduces sexually, producing some offspring with immunity over its parasite, which then evolves in response.

The parasite–host relationship probably drove the prevalence of sexual reproduction over the more efficient asexual reproduction. It seems that when a parasite infects a host, sexual reproduction affords a better chance of developing resistance (through variation in the next generation), giving sexual reproduction variability for fitness not seen in the asexual reproduction, which produces another generation of the organism susceptible to infection by the same parasite. Coevolution between host and parasite may accordingly be responsible for much of the genetic diversity seen in normal populations, including blood-plasma polymorphism, protein polymorphism, and histocompatibility systems.

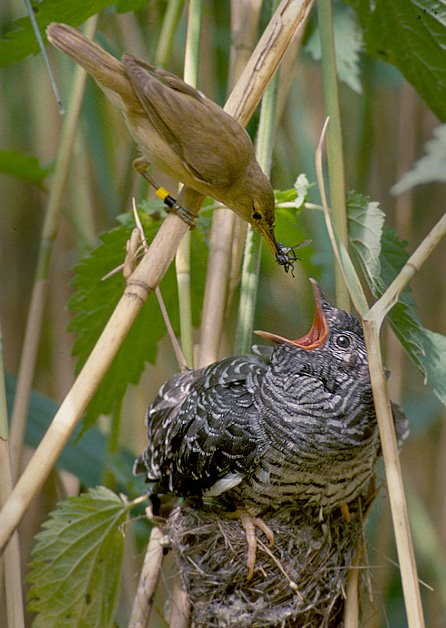
Brood parasite: Eurasian reed warbler raising a common cuckoo

=== Brood parasites ===
Brood parasitism demonstrates close coevolution of host and parasite, for example in some cuckoos. These birds do not make their own nests, but lay their eggs in nests of other species, ejecting or killing the eggs and young of the host and thus having a strong negative impact on the host's reproductive fitness. Their eggs are camouflaged as eggs of their hosts, implying that hosts can distinguish their own eggs from those of intruders and are in an evolutionary arms race with the cuckoo between camouflage and recognition. Cuckoos are counter-adapted to host defences with features such as thickened eggshells, shorter incubation (so their young hatch first), and flat backs adapted to lift eggs out of the nest.

=== Antagonistic coevolution ===
Antagonistic coevolution is seen in two hybridogenic hybrid lineages related to the harvester ant species Pogonomyrmex barbatus and Pogonomyrmex rugosus, in a relationship both parasitic and mutualistic. The queens are unable to produce worker ants by mating with their own species. Only by crossbreeding can they produce workers. The winged females act as parasites for the males of the other species as their sperm will only produce sterile hybrids. But because the colonies are fully dependent on these hybrids to survive, it is also mutualistic. While there is no genetic exchange between the species, they are unable to evolve in a direction where they become too genetically different as this would make crossbreeding impossible.

== Predators and prey ==
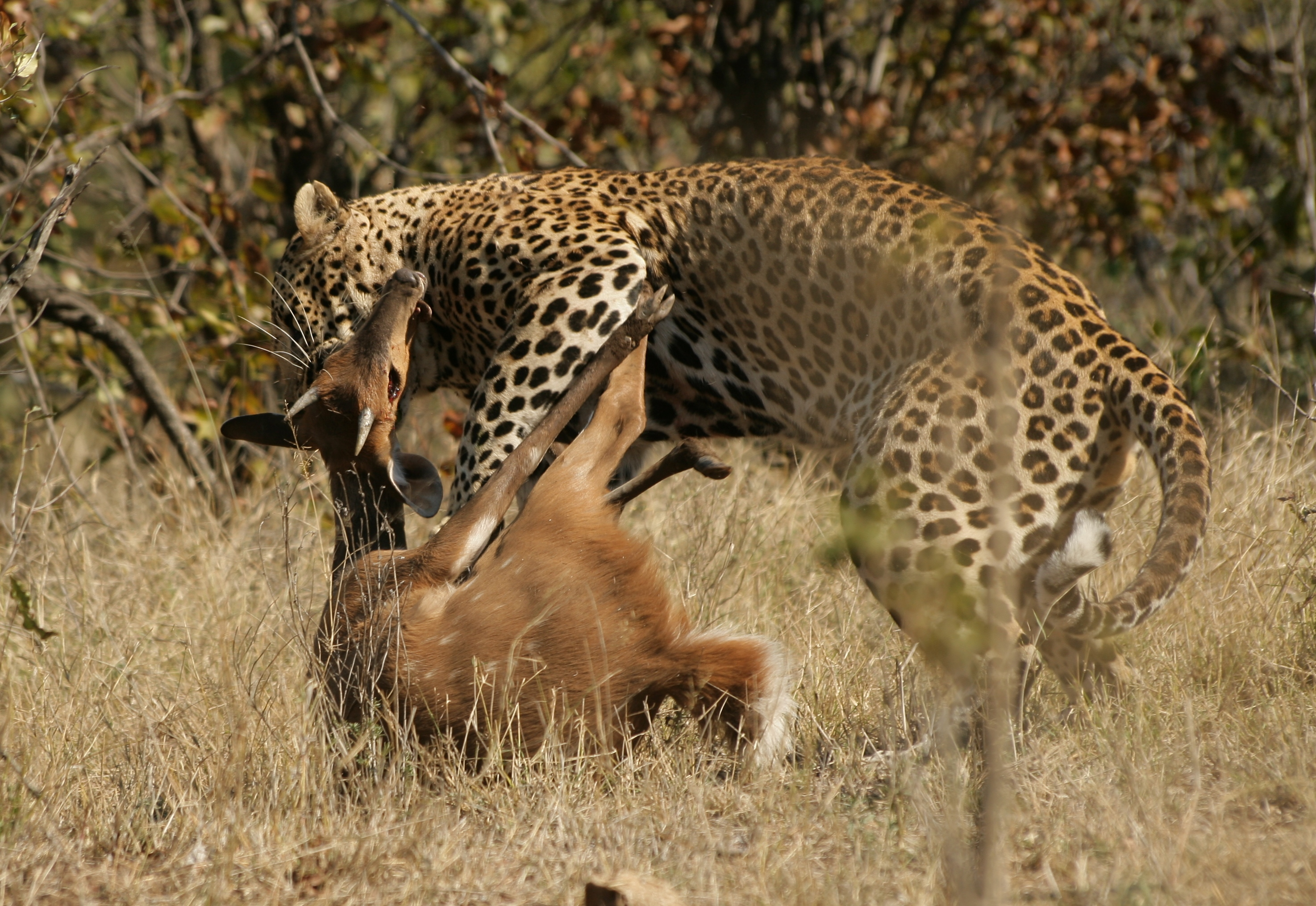
Predator and prey: a leopard killing a bushbuck

Predators and prey interact and coevolve: the predator to catch the prey more effectively, the prey to escape. The coevolution of the two mutually imposes selective pressures. These often lead to an evolutionary arms race between prey and predator, resulting in anti-predator adaptations.

The same applies to herbivores, animals that eat plants, and the plants that they eat. Paul R. Ehrlich and Peter H. Raven in 1964 proposed the theory of escape and radiate coevolution to describe the evolutionary diversification of plants and butterflies. In the Rocky Mountains, red squirrels and crossbills (seed-eating birds) compete for seeds of the lodgepole pine. The squirrels get at pine seeds by gnawing through the cone scales, whereas the crossbills get at the seeds by extracting them with their unusual crossed mandibles. In areas where there are squirrels, the lodgepole's cones are heavier, and have fewer seeds and thinner scales, making it more difficult for squirrels to get at the seeds. Conversely, where there are crossbills but no squirrels, the cones are lighter in construction, but have thicker scales, making it more difficult for crossbills to get at the seeds. The lodgepole's cones are in an evolutionary arms race with the two kinds of herbivore.

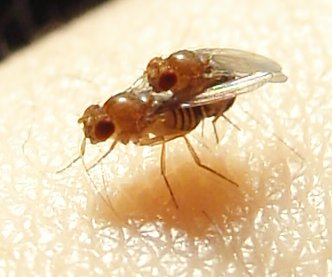
Sexual conflict has been studied in Drosophila melanogaster (shown mating, male on right).

== Competition ==
Both intraspecific competition, with features such as sexual conflict and sexual selection, and interspecific competition, such as between predators, may be able to drive coevolution.

Intraspecific competition can result in sexual antagonistic coevolution, an evolutionary relationship analogous to an arms race, where the evolutionary fitness of the sexes is counteracted to achieve maximum reproductive success. For example, some insects reproduce using traumatic insemination, which is disadvantageous to the female's health. During mating, males try to maximise their fitness by inseminating as many females as possible, but the more times a female's abdomen is punctured, the less likely she is to survive, reducing her fitness.

== Multispecies ==
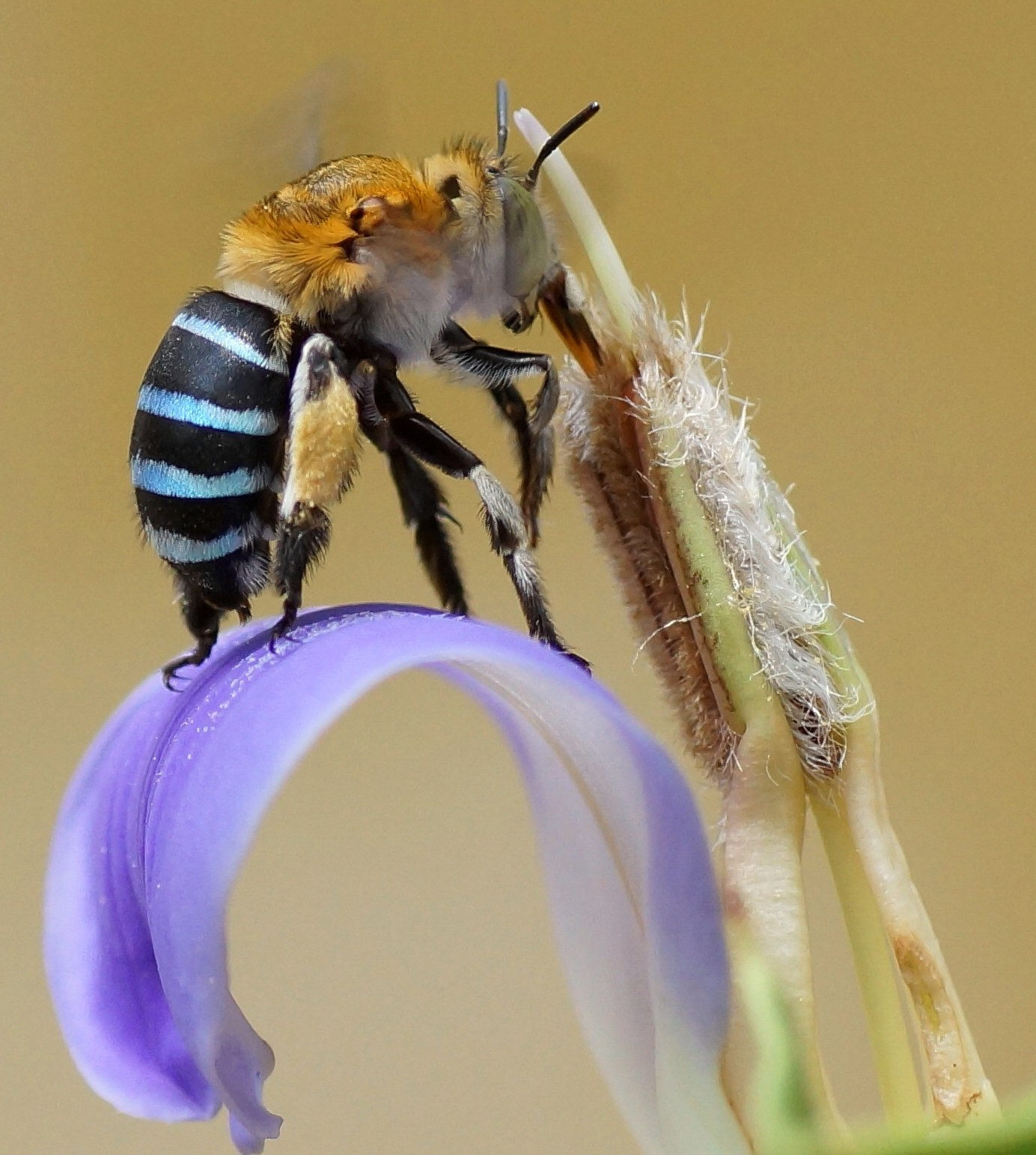
Long-tongued bees and long-tubed flowers coevolved, whether pairwise or "diffusely" in groups known as guilds.

The types of coevolution listed so far have been described as if they operated pairwise (also called specific coevolution), in which traits of one species have evolved in direct response to traits of a second species, and vice versa. This is not always the case. Another evolutionary mode arises where evolution is reciprocal, but is among a group of species rather than exactly two. This is variously called guild or diffuse coevolution. For instance, a trait in several species of flowering plant, such as offering its nectar at the end of a long tube, can coevolve with a trait in one or several species of pollinating insects, such as a long proboscis. More generally, flowering plants are pollinated by insects from different families including bees, flies, and beetles, all of which form a broad guild of pollinators which respond to the nectar or pollen produced by flowers.

== Geographic mosaic theory ==
Mosaic coevolution is a theory in which geographic location and community ecology shape differing coevolution between strongly interacting species in multiple populations. These populations may be separated by space and/or time. Depending on the ecological conditions, the interspecific interactions may be mutualistic or antagonistic. In mutualisms, both partners benefit from the interaction, whereas one partner generally experiences decreased fitness in antagonistic interactions. Arms races consist of two species adapting ways to "one up" the other. Several factors affect these relationships, including hot spots, cold spots, and trait mixing. Reciprocal selection occurs when a change in one partner puts pressure on the other partner to change in response. Hot spots are areas of strong reciprocal selection, while cold spots are areas with no reciprocal selection or where only one partner is present. The three constituents of geographic structure that contribute to this particular type of coevolution are: natural selection in the form of a geographic mosaic, hot spots often surrounded by cold spots, and trait remixing by means of genetic drift and gene flow. Mosaic, along with general coevolution, most commonly occurs at the population level and is driven by both the biotic and the abiotic environment. These environmental factors can constrain coevolution and affect how far it can escalate.

== Outside biology ==
Coevolution is primarily a biological concept, but has been applied to other fields by analogy.

=== In algorithms ===
Coevolutionary algorithms are used for generating artificial life as well as for optimization, game learning and machine learning. Daniel Hillis added "co-evolving parasites" to prevent an optimization procedure from becoming stuck at local maxima. Karl Sims coevolved virtual creatures.

=== In astronomy ===
In astronomy, an emerging theory proposes that black holes and galaxies develop in an interdependent way analogous to biological coevolution.

=== In management and organisation studies ===
Since 2000, coevolution has been explored in management and organisation studies, for example in the business ecosystem of partners of the Intel corporation, where Intel both shapes and is shaped by its partners. However, the processes that characterise coevolution in these fields remain unclear, and its applicability is undefined. It has been suggested that when an organisation seeks ideas from external partners, it tends to select and retain partners whose ideas align with its own. This means that far from passively receiving ideas during a search, organisations actively shape the nature of the contributions they can receive in a two-way "coevolutionary lock-in" process.

=== In political economy ===
Some scholars have applied coevolution to propose non-linear theories in political economy. The Emergence of Organizations and Markets, by John Padgett and Walter Powell, presents case studies of social networks coevolving with institutions, mainly based on early European history (e.g., commercial networks in 13th century Tuscany). A more contemporary application is How China Escaped the Poverty Trap, by Yuen Yuen Ang, which traces the mutual adaptation of the economy and institution, first in China's development under Deng Xiaoping, and also in Nigeria's film industry and American public finance.

=== In sociology ===
In Development Betrayed: The End of Progress and A Coevolutionary Revisioning of the Future (1994) Richard Norgaard proposes a coevolutionary cosmology to explain how social and environmental systems influence and reshape each other. In Coevolutionary Economics: The Economy, Society and the Environment (1994) John Gowdy suggests that: "The economy, society, and the environment are linked together in a coevolutionary relationship".

=== In system development ===
Computer software and hardware can be considered as two separate components but tied intrinsically by coevolution. Similarly, operating systems and computer applications, web browsers, and web applications. All these systems depend upon each other and advance through a kind of evolutionary process. Changes in hardware, an operating system or web browser may introduce new features that are then incorporated into the corresponding applications running alongside. The idea is closely related to the concept of "joint optimization" in sociotechnical systems analysis and design, where a system is understood to consist of both a "technical system" encompassing the tools and hardware used for production and maintenance, and a "social system" of relationships and procedures through which the technology is tied into the goals of the system and all the other human and organizational relationships within and outside the system. Such systems work best when the technical and social systems are deliberately developed together.

The concept of coevolution has been used by Mary Lou Maher and others to model the dynamic relationship between clarification of problem definition and development of a matching solution over time within a system development process. An assumed linear progression from 'problem' to 'solution', has been reinterpreted as a coevolutionary progression in which ideas for possible solutions influence and change the understanding of the problem. Developed at first from within the computational context of genetic algorithms, coevolution has been developed as a general, descriptive model of the design process, not only in individual design work but also in teamwork.

== See also ==
- Evolutionary arms race
- Bak–Sneppen model
- CoEvolution Quarterly
- Coextinction
- Ecological fitting
- Escape and radiate coevolution
- Genomics of domestication
