= Trans-2-Hexenal =

trans-2-Hexenal

Names
- Preferred IUPAC name (2E)-hex-2-enal
- Other names (trans)-2-Hexenal (2(E))-hexenal; 6728-26-3 (E)-Hex-2-enal; 3-propylacrolein β-propylacrolein

Identifiers
| CAS Number | 6728-26-3 |
| 3D model (JSmol) | Interactive image |
| ChEBI | CHEBI:28913 |
| ChEMBL | ChEMBL2228570 |
| ChemSpider | 4444608 |
| ECHA InfoCard | 100.027.072 |
| EC Number | 229-778-1 |
| KEGG | C08497 |
| PubChem CID | 5281168 |
| UNII | 69JX3AIR1I |
| CompTox Dashboard (EPA) | DTXSID1041425 |
- InChI: InChI=1S/C6H10O/c1-2-3-4-5-6-7/h4-6H,2-3H2,1H3/b5-4+ Key: MBDOYVRWFFCFHM-SNAWJCMRSA-N
- SMILES: CCC/C=C/C=O

Properties
| Chemical formula | C_{6}H_{10}O |
| Molar mass | 98.14 g/mol |
| Density | 0.841-0.848 g/cm^{3} |
| Boiling point | 47.00°C @ 17.00 mmHg |
| Vapor pressure | 6.6 mmHg |

Hazards
- GHS labelling
| Pictograms | (GHS02: Flammable) (GHS06: Toxic) (GHS07: Exclamation mark) (GHS09: Environmental hazard) |
| Signal word | Danger |
| Hazard statements | H226, H302, H311, H317, H319, H411 |
| Precautionary statements | P210, P233, P240, P241, P242, P243, P261, P262, P264, P264+P265, P270, P272, P273, P280, P301+P317, P302+P352, P303+P361+P353, P305+P351+P338, P316, P321, P330, P333+P317, P337+P317, P361+P364, P362+P364, P370+P378, P391, P403+P235, P405, P501 |

Related compounds
| Related alkenals | (cis)-3-hexenal |
- Except where otherwise noted, data are given for materials in their standard state (at 25 °C [77 °F], 100 kPa). Infobox references

trans-2-Hexenal is an organic unsaturated aldehyde with a six-carbon chain. This clear, pale yellow liquid has a green, leafy, herbal fruit smell. It occurs naturally in a wide variety of plants, fruits, vegetables, and spices, and appears to be an important mediating and signalling chemical in plant-fungus and plant-insect interactions, such as the symbiosis between acacia ants and Acacias.

== Occurrence ==
This aldehyde is a commonly produced volatile organic compound (VOC) among the flowering plants. It is among the VOCs known as green leaf volatiles, as they are released following damage to the leaf, whether by crushing, herbivory, or bacterial or fungal infection. It is also found in other parts of the plant. For example, it was found to constitute 34% of the total VOCs from fresh strawberry fruits and 28% of VOCs from fresh tomato fruits.

trans-2-hexenal appears to be an airborne signalling chemical that can upregulate plant defenses, from leaf to leaf on the same plant as well as between neighboring plants. It has been shown to inhibit the growth of fungal pathogens.

It is also implicated in the mutualistic relationship between Acacia and related trees and their ant partners. The bullhorn acacia tree, Vachellia cornigera, grows inflated hollow spines at the base of its leaves that serve as nesting places for its symbiotic partner, the acacia ant, Pseudomyrmex ferruginea. The tree produces sugary nectar and fat- and protein-rich nutrient packets at the tips of its leaflets to serve as food for the ants. In return, the ants react aggressively towards any pest or herbivore which damages the Acacia leaves. It is the release of trans-2-hexenal from the damaged leaf that the ants sense and react to.

== Uses ==
This aldehyde is approved for use as a food additive and is used, highly diluted, in perfumery. It is said to lend a green apple, leafy, herbal, spicy banana note to a fragrance.

It may also find use as an antifungal agent, including as a post-harvest fruit preservative.

== See also ==
- Myrmecophyte, a plant that lives in a mutualistic association with ants
- Synomone, a signalling chemical which benefits both parties in a symbiotic relationship
- Plant defense against herbivory
- Plant communication
- cis-3-Hexenal, a similar aldehyde which also mediates plant-insect interactions
