= Symbiosis =

Ecological interaction between taxa

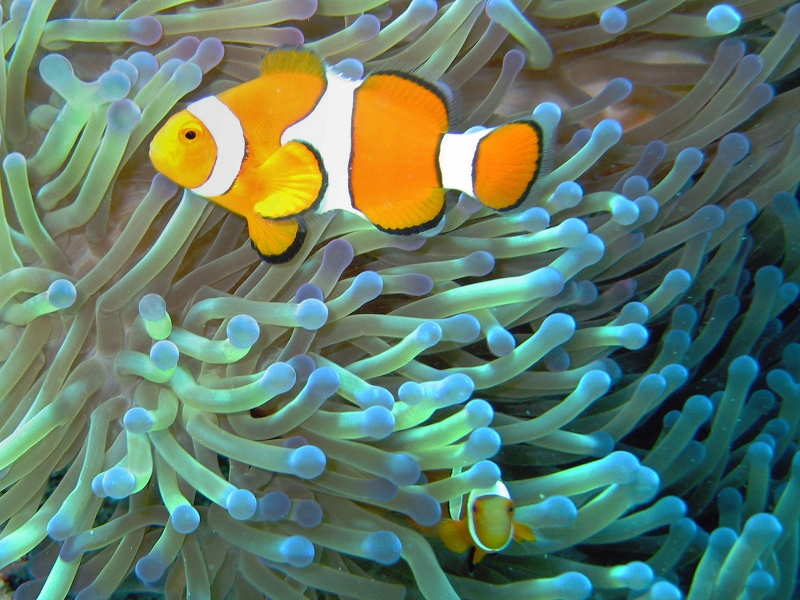
In a cleaning symbiosis, the clownfish feeds on small invertebrates, that otherwise have potential to harm the sea anemone, and the fecal matter from the clownfish provides nutrients to the sea anemone. The clownfish is protected from predators by the anemone's stinging cells, to which the clownfish is immune. The relationship is therefore classified as mutualistic.

Symbiosis (pl.: symbioses) is any close and long-term biological interaction between two organisms of different species. In 1879, Heinrich Anton de Bary defined symbiosis as "the living together of unlike organisms". The term is sometimes more exclusively used in a restricted, mutualistic sense, where both symbionts contribute to each other's subsistence. This means that they benefit each other in some way.

Symbiosis is diverse and can be classified in multiple ways. It can be obligate, meaning that one or both of the organisms depend on each other for survival, or facultative, meaning that they can subsist independently. When one organism lives on the surface of another, such as head lice on humans, it is called ectosymbiosis; when one partner lives inside the tissues of another, such as Symbiodinium within coral, it is termed endosymbiosis. Where the interaction reduces both parties' fitness, it is called competition; where just one party's fitness is reduced, it is called amensalism. Where one benefits but the other is largely unaffected, this is termed commensalism. Where one benefits at the other's expense, it is called parasitism. Finally, where both parties benefit, the relationship is described as mutualistic.

Symbiosis has often driven the evolution of species; mutualism has enabled species for example to colonise new environments. Symbiogenesis is thought to have helped to create the eukaryotes as bacteria were incorporated as mitochondria and chloroplasts within cells. Major co-evolutionary relationships include mycorrhiza, the pollination of flowers by insects, the protection of acacia trees by ants, seed dispersal by animals, nitrogen fixation by bacteria in the root nodules of legumes, and the mutualistic partnership of algae and fungi to form lichens.

== Definition ==
Diagram of the six possible types of symbiotic relationship, from mutual benefit to mutual harm.

The term "symbiosis" is derived from Ancient Greek συμβίωσις symbíōsis: living with, companionship < σύν sýn: together; and βίωσις bíōsis: living.

The definition of symbiosis was a matter of debate for 130 years. In 1877, Albert Bernhard Frank used the term symbiosis to describe the mutualistic relationship found in lichens. (Note: Frank wrote (p. 195): "Nach den erweiterten Kenntnissen, die wir in den letzten Jahren über das Zusammenleben zweier verschiedenartiger Wesen gewonnen haben, ist es ein dringendes Bedürfniss, die einzelnen von einander abweichenden Formen dieser Verhältnisse mit besonderen Bezeichnungen to belegen, da man fast für alle bisher den Ausdruck Parasitsmus gebrauchte. Wir müssen sämmtliche Fälle, wo überhaupt ein Auf- oder Ineinanderwohnen zweier verschiedener Species stattfindet, unter einen weitesten Begriff bringen, welcher die Rolle, die beide Wesen dabei spielen, noch nicht berücksichtigt, also auf das blosse Zusammenleben begründet ist, und wofür sich die Bezeichnung Symbiotismus empfehlen dürfte." (In the aftermath of the expanded knowledge that we have acquired in recent years about the coexistence of two distinct living things, there is an urgent need to bestow specific designations on the different individual forms of these relationships, since up till now one has used for almost all [of them] the term "parasitism". We must bring all cases, wherever one of two different species lives on or in the other, under the broadest concept which does not consider the roles that the two living things play thereby ([and] thus is based on mere coexistence) and for which the designation symbiotismus [i.e., symbiosis] might be suggested.) In 1878, the German mycologist Heinrich Anton de Bary defined it more broadly as "the living together of unlike organisms". Over time, the definition has varied among scientists. Some have argued that it should refer only to persistent mutualisms, while others have proposed that it should include all long-term biological interactions (i.e., mutualism, commensalism, and parasitism), but exclude brief interactions such as predation.

In 1949, Edward Haskell proposed an integrative approach with a classification of "co-actions", which was later adopted by biologists as "interactions".

== Types ==
=== Obligate versus facultative ===
Relationships can be obligate, meaning that one or both of the symbionts entirely depend on each other for survival. For example, in lichens, which consist of fungal and photosynthetic symbionts, the fungal partners cannot live on their own. The algal or cyanobacterial symbionts (e.g. Trentepohlia) can usually survive alone, so their involvement is considered facultative (optional) rather than obligate. When one of the participants in a symbiotic relationship is capable of photosynthesis, as with lichens, it is called photosymbiosis.

=== Ecto- and endosymbiosis ===
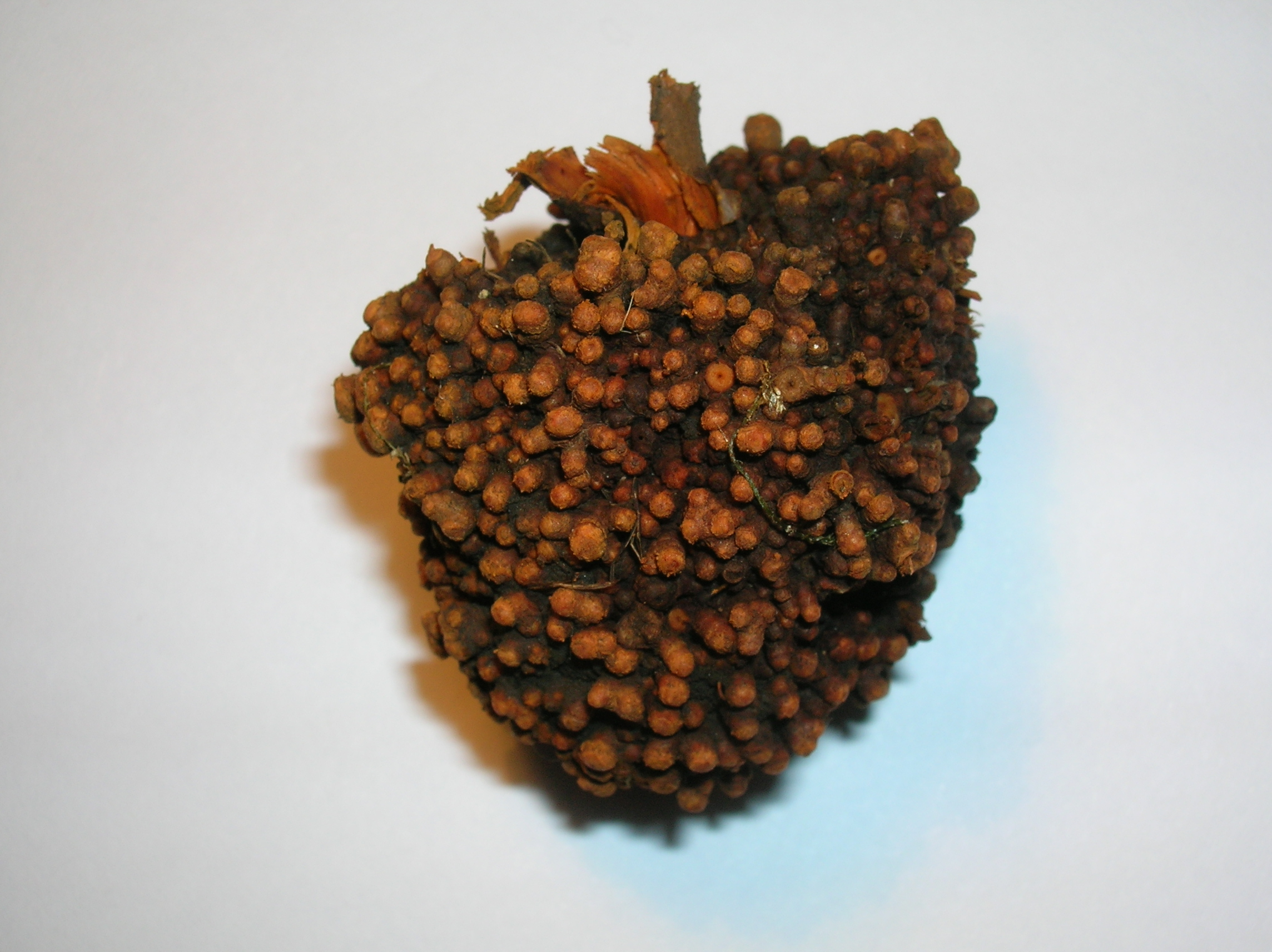
Alder tree root nodule houses endosymbiotic nitrogen-fixing bacteria.

Ectosymbiosis is a symbiotic relationship where the symbiont lives on the surface of the host, including its digestive tract or exocrine gland ducts. Examples include ectoparasites such as lice, and commensals such as barnacles on baleen whales.

Contrastingly, endosymbiosis is a symbiotic relationship in which one symbiont lives within the tissues of the other, either within or between its cells. Examples include diverse microbiomes: rhizobia, nitrogen-fixing bacteria that live in root nodules on legume roots; actinomycetes, nitrogen-fixing bacteria such as Frankia, which live in alder root nodules; single-celled algae inside reef-building corals; and bacterial endosymbionts that provide essential nutrients to about 10%–15% of insects. Endosymbionts gain nutrients from their hosts, sometimes modifying the host's genome in their favour. Endosymbionts adapt to the environment inside their hosts. They often have a much reduced genome, losing protein-coding gene for metabolism and DNA repair. When insects' endosymbiotic bacteria are passed on to the insects' offspring, populations of intracellular bacteria are reduced, as compared to free-living bacteria. The endosymbiotic bacteria are unable to reinstate their wild type phenotype via a recombination process called Muller's ratchet. This, together with reduced population, leads to an accretion of deleterious mutations in the non-essential genes of the intracellular bacteria.

=== Competition ===
Competition is an interaction in which one organism's fitness is reduced by another's presence. Competition can also occur between cells within the same organism, which is why older cells are usually eliminated from tissues. This allows the organism to stay as healthy as possible by constantly eliminating old cells and making new ones. Limited supply of at least one resource (such as food, water, and territory) used by both usually facilitates this type of interaction, although the competition can also be for other resources.

=== Amensalism ===
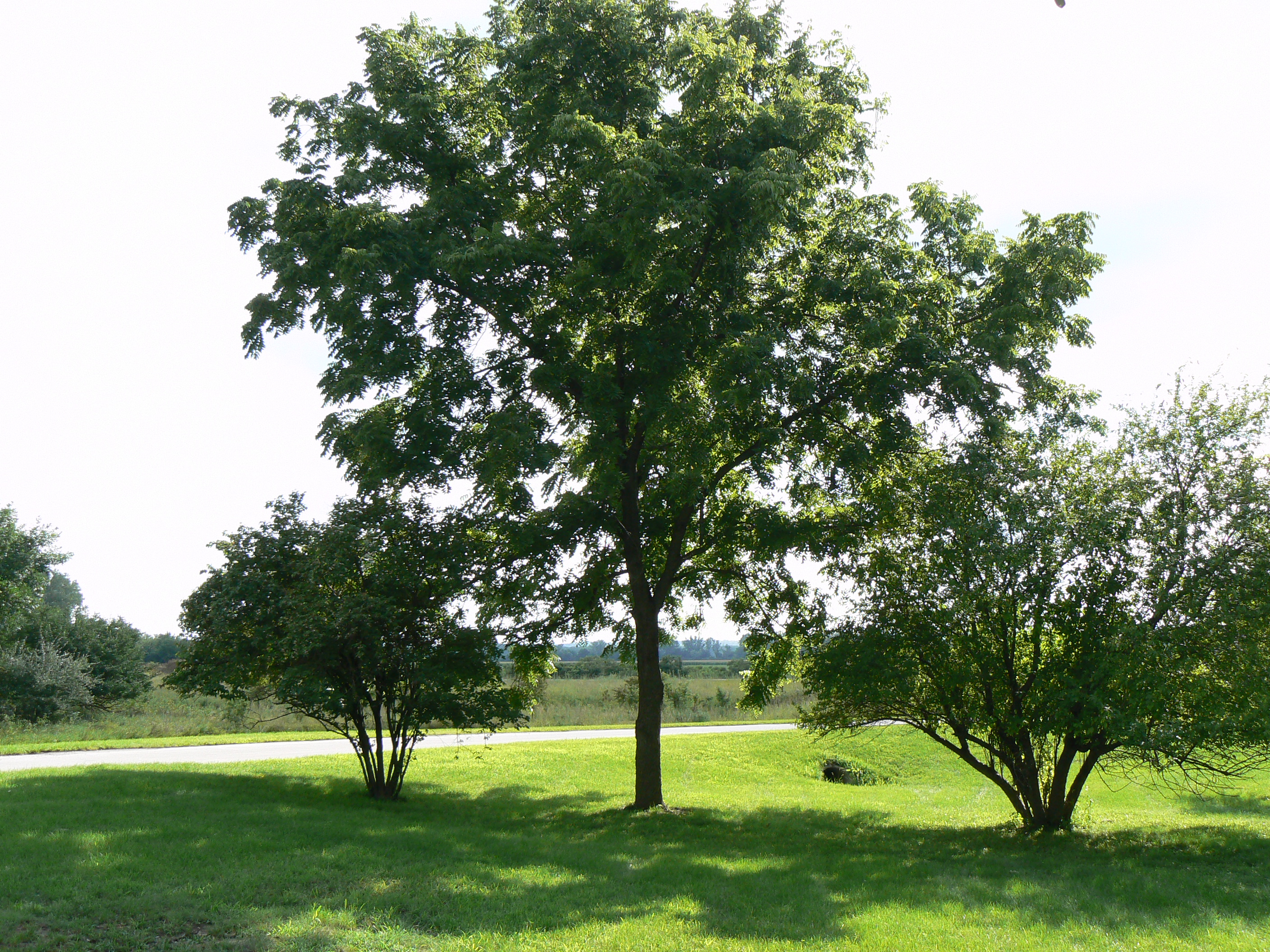
The black walnut secretes a chemical from its roots that harms neighboring plants, an example of antagonism.

Amensalism is a non-mutualistic, asymmetric interaction where one species is harmed or killed by the other, and one is unaffected by the other. There are two types of amensalism: competition and antagonism (or antibiosis). Competition is where a larger or stronger organism deprives a smaller or weaker one of a resource. Antagonism occurs when one organism is damaged or killed by another through a chemical secretion. An example of competition is a sapling growing under the shadow of a mature tree. The mature tree can rob the sapling of necessary sunlight and, if the mature tree is very large, it can take up rainwater and deplete soil nutrients. Throughout the process, the mature tree is unaffected by the sapling. Indeed, if the sapling dies, the mature tree gains nutrients from the decaying sapling. An example of antagonism is Juglans nigra (black walnut), secreting juglone, a substance which destroys many herbaceous plants within its root zone.

An example in animals is the relationship between the Spanish ibex and weevils of the genus Timarcha which feed upon the same type of shrub. Whilst the presence of the weevil has almost no influence on food availability, the presence of ibex has a detrimental effect on weevil numbers, as they consume significant quantities of plant matter and incidentally ingest the weevils upon it.

=== Commensalism ===
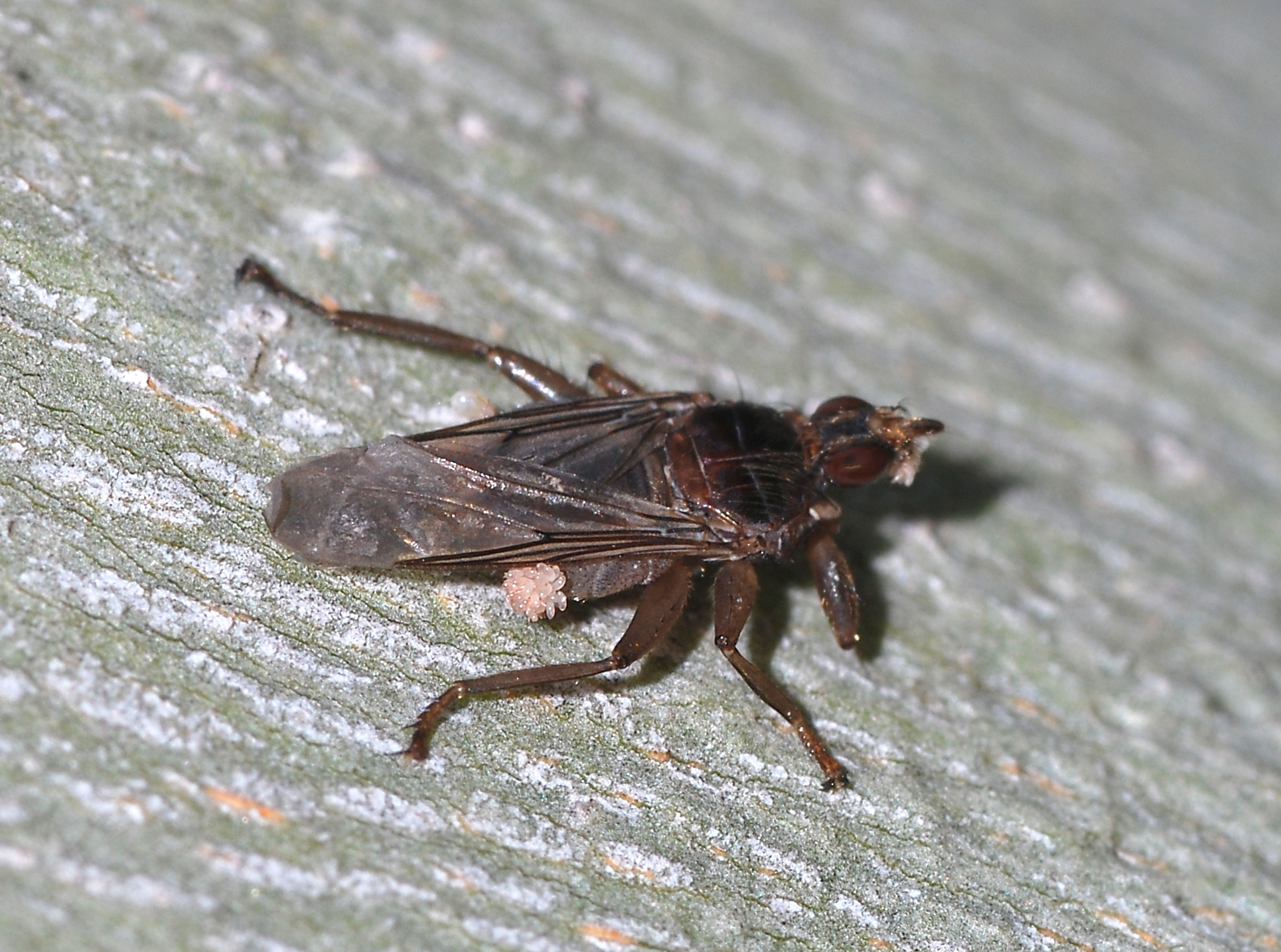
Commensal mites travelling (phoresy) on a fly (Pseudolynchia canariensis)

Commensalism describes a relationship between two living organisms where one benefits and the other is not significantly harmed or helped. It is derived from the English word commensal, used of human social interaction. It derives from a medieval Latin word meaning sharing food, formed from com- (with) and mensa (table).

Commensal relationships may involve one organism using another for transportation (phoresy) or for housing (inquilinism), or it may also involve one organism using something another created, after its death (metabiosis). Examples of metabiosis are hermit crabs using gastropod shells to protect their bodies, and spiders building their webs on plants.

=== Mutualism ===
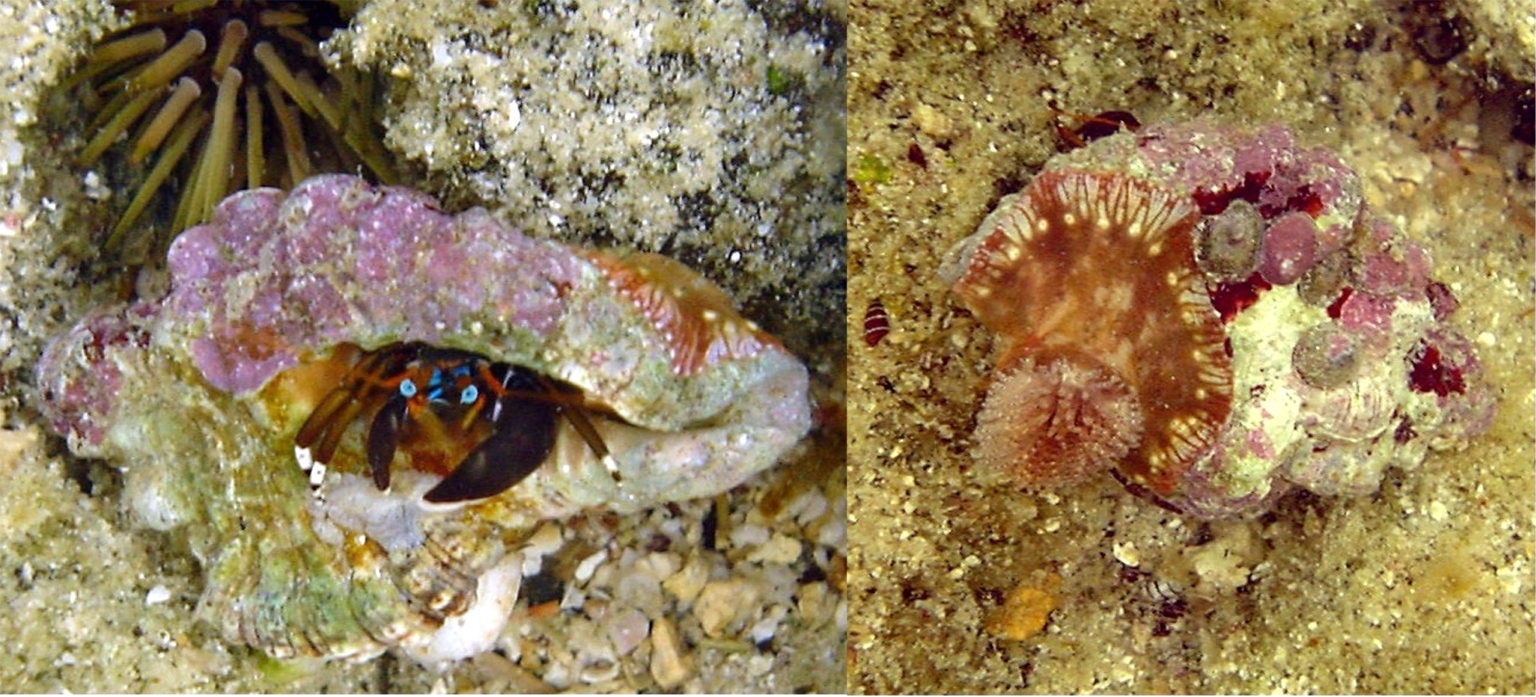
Hermit crab, Calcinus laevimanus, with sea anemone

Mutualism or interspecies reciprocal altruism is a long-term relationship between individuals of different species where both individuals benefit. Mutualistic relationships may be either obligate for both species, obligate for one but facultative for the other, or facultative for both.

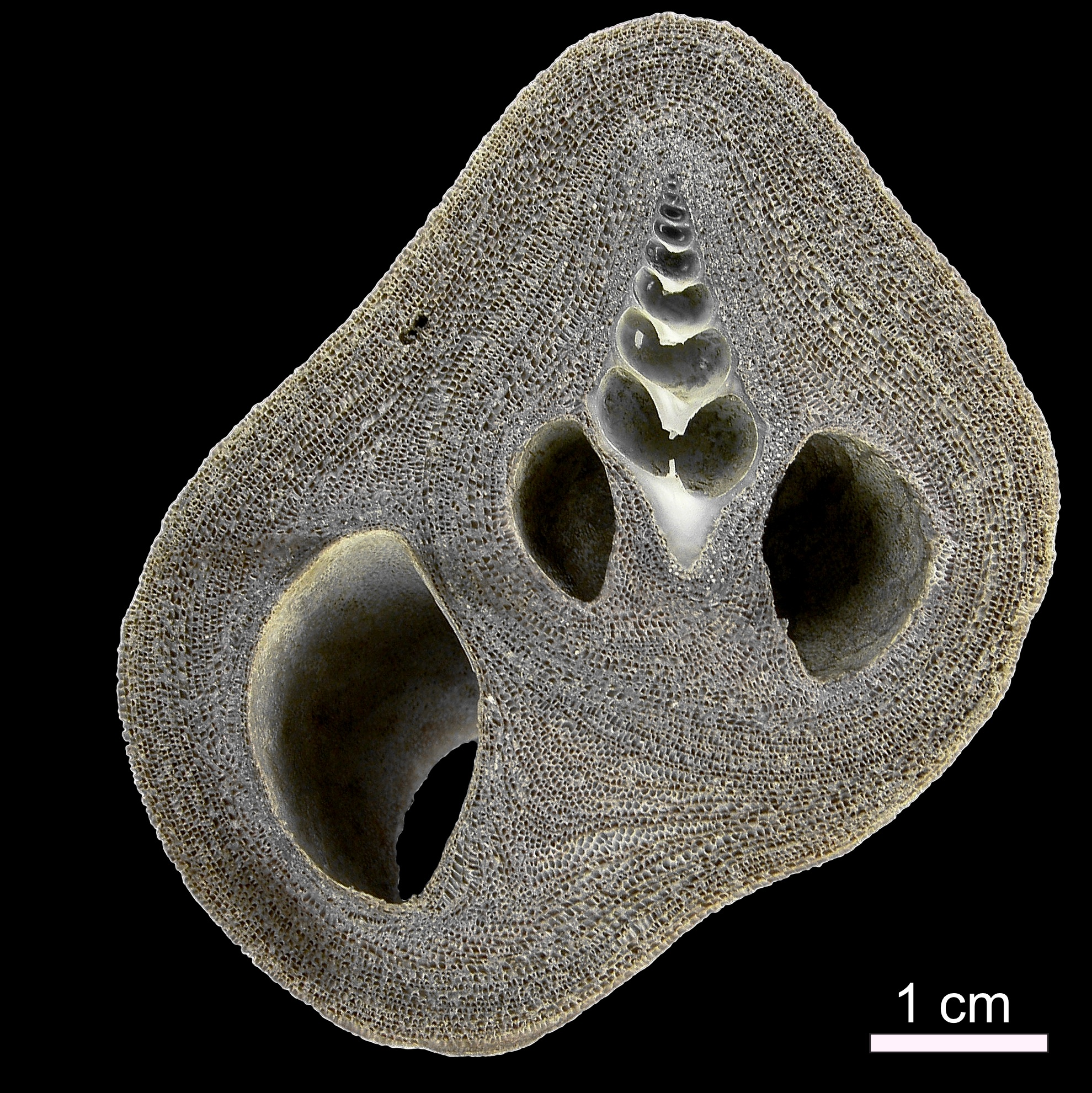
Bryoliths document a mutualistic symbiosis between a hermit crab and encrusting bryozoans.

Many herbivores have mutualistic gut flora to help them digest plant matter, which is more difficult to digest than animal prey. This gut flora comprises cellulose-digesting protozoans or bacteria living in the herbivores' intestines. Coral reefs result from mutualism between coral organisms and various algae living inside them. Most land plants and land ecosystems rely on mutualism between the plants, which fix carbon from the air, and mycorrhyzal fungi, which help in extracting water and minerals from the ground.

An example of mutualism is the relationship between the ocellaris clownfish that dwell among the tentacles of Riterri sea anemones. The territorial fish protects the anemone from anemone-eating fish, and in turn, the anemone stinging tentacles protect the clownfish from its predators. A special mucus on the clownfish protects it from the stinging tentacles.

A further example is the goby, a fish which sometimes lives together with a shrimp. The shrimp digs and cleans up a burrow in the sand in which both the shrimp and the goby fish live. The shrimp is almost blind, leaving it vulnerable to predators when outside its burrow. In case of danger, the goby touches the shrimp with its tail to warn it, and both quickly retreat into the burrow. Different species of gobies (Elacatinus spp.) also clean up ectoparasites in other fish, possibly another kind of mutualism.

An example of obligate mutualism is the relationship between the siboglinid tube worms and bacteria in hydrothermal vents and cold seeps. The worm has no digestive tract and is therefore wholly reliant on its internal symbionts for nutrition. The bacteria oxidize either hydrogen sulfide or methane, which the host supplies to them.

Mutualism improves both organisms' competitive ability, enabling them to outperform members of the same species that lack the symbiont.

A facultative symbiosis is seen in encrusting bryozoans and hermit crabs. The bryozoan colony (Acanthodesia commensale) develops a cirumrotatory growth and offers the crab (Pseudopagurus granulimanus) a helicospiral-tubular extension of its living chamber that initially was situated within a gastropod shell.

=== Parasitism ===
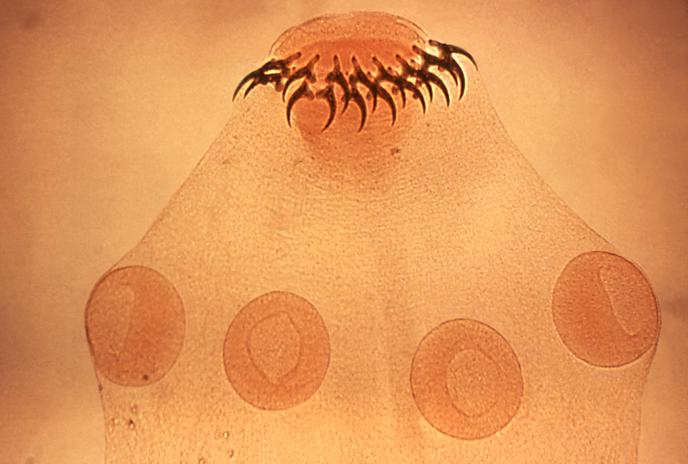
Head (scolex) of tapeworm Taenia solium is adapted to parasitism with hooks and suckers to attach to its host.

In a parasitic relationship, the parasite benefits while the host is harmed. Parasitism takes many forms, from endoparasites that live within the host's body to ectoparasites and parasitic castrators that live on its surface and micropredators like mosquitoes that visit intermittently. Parasitism is a successful and common mode of life. About 40% of all animal species are parasites, and the average mammal species is host to 4 nematodes, 2 cestodes, and 2 trematodes.

=== Mimicry ===
Mimicry is a form of symbiosis in which a species adopts distinct characteristics of another species to alter its relationship dynamic with the species being mimicked, to its own advantage. Among the many types of mimicry are Batesian and Müllerian, the first involving one-sided exploitation, the second providing mutual benefit. Batesian mimicry is an exploitative three-party interaction where one species, the mimic, has evolved to mimic another, the model, to deceive a third, the dupe. In terms of signalling theory, the mimic and model have evolved to send a signal; the dupe has evolved to receive it from the model. This is to the advantage of the mimic but to the detriment of both the model, whose protective signals are effectively weakened, and the dupe, which is deprived of an edible prey. For example, a wasp is a strongly defended model, which signals with its conspicuous black and yellow coloration that it is an unprofitable prey to predators such as birds which hunt by sight; many hoverflies are Batesian mimics of wasps, and any bird that avoids these hoverflies is a dupe. In contrast, Müllerian mimicry is mutually beneficial as all participants are both models and mimics. For example, different species of bumblebee mimic each other, with similar warning coloration in combinations of black, white, red, and yellow, and all of them benefit from the relationship.

=== Cleaning symbiosis ===
Cleaning symbiosis is an association between individuals of two species, where one (the cleaner) removes and eats parasites and other materials from the surface of the other (the client). It is putatively mutually beneficial, but biologists have long debated whether it is mutual selfishness, or simply exploitative. Cleaning symbiosis is well known among marine fish, where some small species of cleaner fish – notably wrasses, but also species in other genera – are specialized to feed almost exclusively by cleaning larger fish and other marine animals. Typically, the host visits a specific 'cleaning station' and adopts a stationary posture while cleaners remove parasites.

Cleaner fish play an essential role in the reduction of parasitism on marine animals. Some shark species participate in cleaning symbiosis, where cleaner fish remove ectoparasites from the body of the shark. Sharks display specific behaviours in interactions with cleaner wrasse (Labroides dimidiatus). For example, the lemon shark remains passive and the wrasse swims to it. It scans the shark's body, inspecting the gills, labial regions, and skin. When it enters the shark's mouth, the shark ceases breathing for the inspection. When the shark begins to close its mouth, the wrasse leaves.

== Role in evolution ==
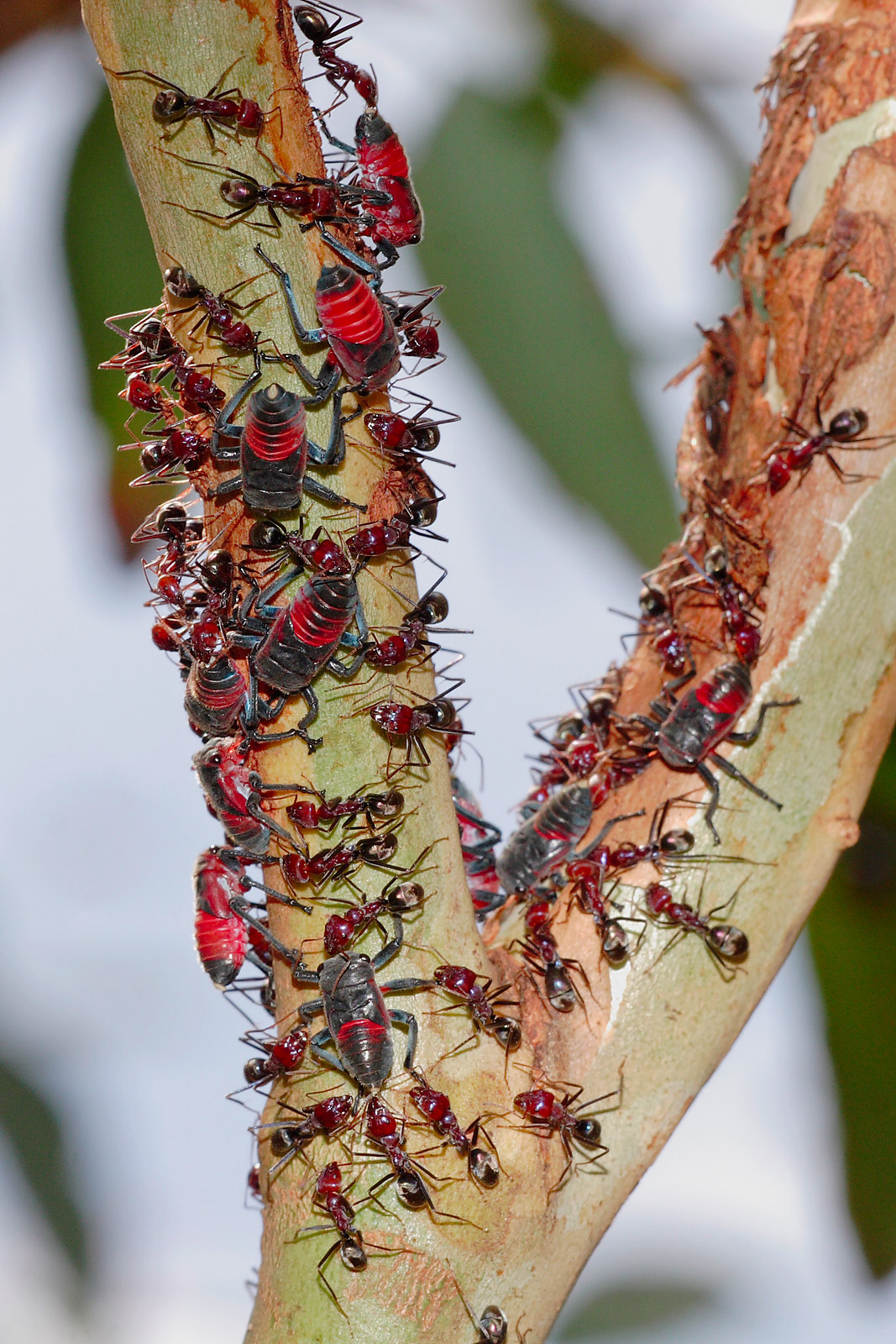
Leafhoppers protected by meat ants

Symbiosis is increasingly recognized as an important selective force behind evolution; many species have a long history of interdependent co-evolution.

Although symbiosis was once discounted as an anecdotal evolutionary phenomenon, evidence is now overwhelming that obligate or facultative associations among microorganisms and between microorganisms and multicellular hosts had crucial consequences in many landmark events in evolution and in the generation of phenotypic diversity and complex phenotypes able to colonise new environments.

Mutualistic symbiosis can sometimes evolve from parasitism or commensalism, Fungi's relationship to plants in the form of mycelium evolved from parasitism and commensalism. Under certain conditions, species of fungi previously in a state of mutualism can turn parasitic on weak or dying plants. Likewise the symbiotic relationship of clown fish and sea anemones emerged from a commensalist relationship.

=== Hologenome development and evolution ===
Evolution originated from changes in development where variations within species are selected for or against because of the symbionts involved. The hologenome theory relates to the holobiont and symbionts genome together as a whole. Microbes live everywhere in and on every multicellular organism. Many organisms rely on their symbionts in order to develop properly, which is known as co-development. In cases of co-development, the symbionts send signals to their host which determine developmental processes. Co-development is commonly seen in both arthropods and vertebrates.

=== Symbiogenesis ===
One hypothesis for the origin of the nucleus in eukaryotes is that it developed from a symbiogenesis between bacteria and archaea. It is hypothesized that the symbiosis originated when ancient archaea, similar to modern methanogenic archaea, invaded and lived within bacteria similar to modern myxobacteria, eventually forming the early nucleus. This theory is analogous to the accepted theory for the origin of eukaryotic mitochondria and chloroplasts, which are thought to have developed from a similar endosymbiotic relationship between proto-eukaryotes and bacteria. Evidence for this includes the fact that mitochondria and chloroplasts divide independently of the cell, and that these organelles have their own genome.

The biologist Lynn Margulis, famous for her work on endosymbiosis, contended that symbiosis is a major driving force behind evolution. She considered Darwin's notion of evolution, driven by competition, to be incomplete and claimed that evolution is strongly based on co-operation, interaction, and mutual dependence among organisms. According to Margulis and her son Dorion Sagan, "Life did not take over the globe by combat, but by networking."

== Major examples of co-evolutionary relationships ==
=== Mycorrhiza ===
About 80% of vascular plants worldwide form symbiotic relationships with fungi, in particular in arbuscular mycorrhizas. The mutualism evolved due to the limitation of plant root capacity for absorbing soil nutrients, especially phosphate and nitrogen, which are crucial for plant growth.

=== Pollination ===
Pollination is a mutualism between flowering plants and their animal pollinators.

Flowering plants and the animals that pollinate them have co-evolved. Many plants that are pollinated by insects (in entomophily), bats, or birds (in ornithophily) have highly specialized flowers modified to promote pollination by a specific pollinator that is correspondingly adapted. The first flowering plants in the fossil record had relatively simple flowers. Adaptive speciation quickly gave rise to many diverse groups of plants, and, at the same time, corresponding speciation occurred in certain insect groups. Some groups of plants developed nectar and large sticky pollen, while insects evolved more specialized morphologies to access and collect these rich food sources. In some taxa of plants and insects, the relationship has become dependent, where the plant species can only be pollinated by one species of insect.

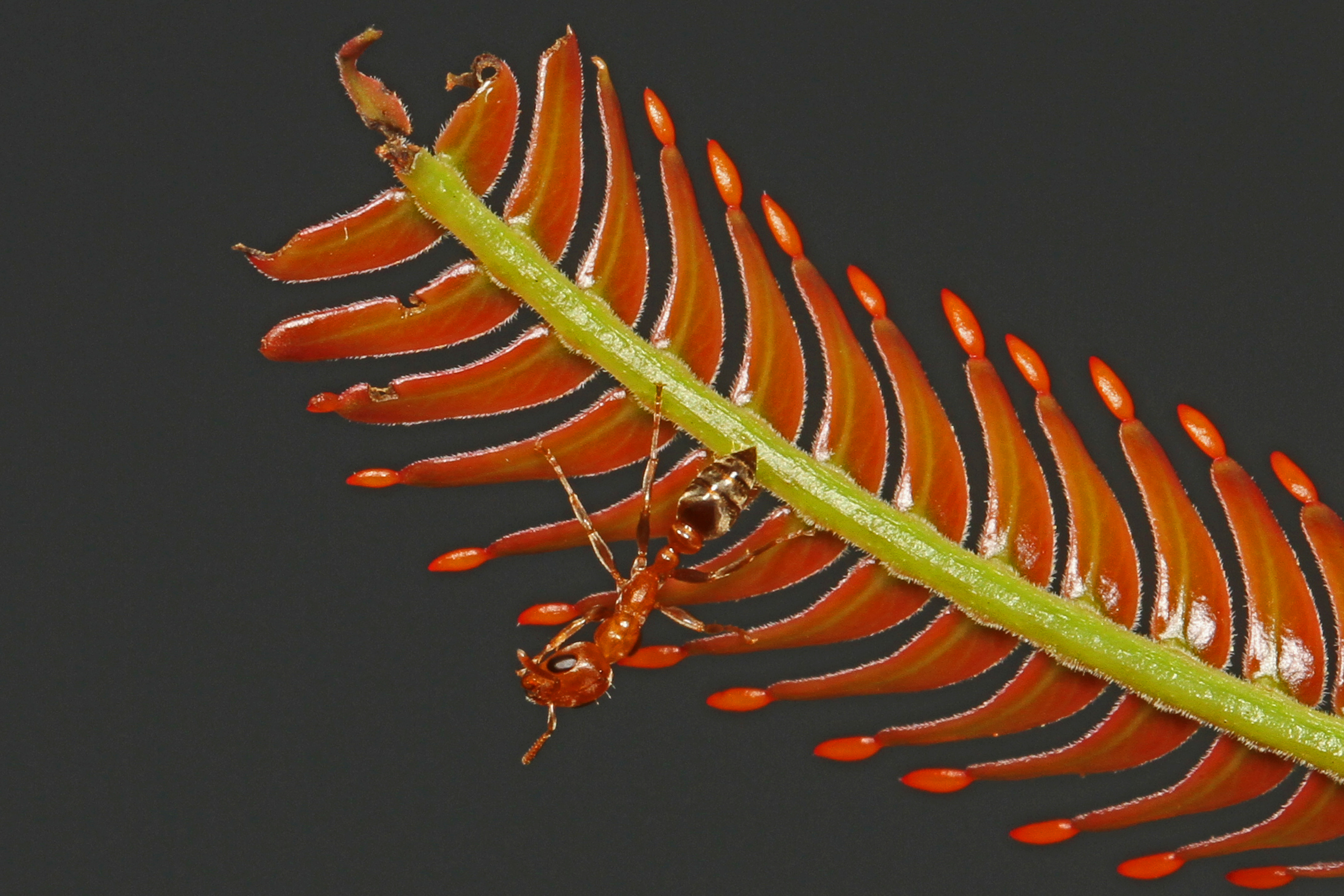
Pseudomyrmex ant on bull thorn acacia (Vachellia cornigera) with Beltian bodies that provide the ants with protein

=== Acacia ants and acacias ===
The acacia ant (Pseudomyrmex ferruginea) is an obligate plant ant that protects several species of "Acacia" (Vachellia) from preying insects and from other plants competing for sunlight, and the tree provides nourishment and shelter for the ant and its larvae.

=== Seed dispersal ===
Seed dispersal is the movement, spread or transport of seeds away from the parent plant. Plants have limited mobility and rely upon a variety of dispersal vectors to transport their propagules, including both abiotic vectors such as the wind and living (biotic) vectors like birds. In order to attract animals, these plants evolved a set of morphological characters such as fruit colour, mass, and persistence correlated to particular seed dispersal agents. For example, plants may evolve conspicuous fruit colours to attract avian frugivores, and birds may learn to associate such colours with a food resource.

=== Nitrogen fixation in legumes ===
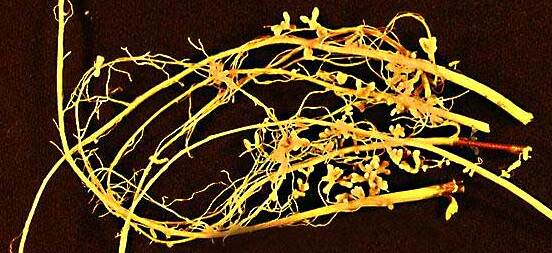
Root nodules, each containing billions of Rhizobiaceae bacteria, fix nitrogen in symbiosis with a legume.

Rhizobia are bacteria that fix nitrogen inside the root nodules of legumes such as beans and clover. To express genes for nitrogen fixation, rhizobia require a plant host; they cannot independently fix nitrogen. Rhizobia infect the legume's roots and produce nodules where they fix nitrogen gas (N_{2}) from the atmosphere, turning it into a more readily useful form of nitrogen. From here, the nitrogen is exported and used for growth in the legume.

=== Lichens ===
A lichen is a hybrid colony of algae or cyanobacteria living symbiotically among the hyphal filaments of multiple species of fungi and other micro-organisms embedded in the outer layer or cortex, in a mutualistic relationship. Lichens are able to flourish in harsh environments such as bare rocks.

== See also ==
- Aposymbiotic
- Cheating (biology)
- Human Microbiome Project
- Microbial consortium
- Photosymbiosis
- Socio-ecological system
- Specificity (symbiosis)
- Symbiotic fermentation
