= Antagonism (phytopathology) =

Action of an organism that harms or interferes with the functioning of another organism

Antagonism (in phytopathology) occurs when one organism inhibits or slows down the growth of a plant disease-causing organism, such as harmful bacteria or fungi. Most plants can host a variety of pathogens and are often infected by multiple species simultaneously. In ecology, species competing for the same resource can influence each other in two ways: antagonism, where one pathogen harms another, and synergism, where one pathogen supports the growth of another.

Antagonism is often employed as a natural method to protect plants from diseases. This can occur through mechanism such as competition for space and nutrients, the production of toxins or siderophores by one pathogen to suppress another, induction of host resistance, or other processes that inhibit the growth or reproduction of pathogens, as demonstrated in the Ascochyta blight complex on peas.

== Mechanism ==
=== Antibiosis ===
The mechanism of antibiosis involves an interaction between two organisms, where one organism produces substances such as toxins, enzymes, or antibiotics that harm another organism, particularly pathogens. These interactions reduce pathogen viability of pathogens, limit the spread of disease, and enhance plant protection. For instance, antagonistic microbes can produce lytic enzymes, such as chitinases, which break down the cell walls of fungal pathogens, effectively inhibiting their growth. Another example is Pseudomonas aeruginosa, which shows antagonism against Cladosporium. Such organisms are of great practical importance as they often produce antibiotics that modify normal growth processes.

=== Hyperparasitism ===
The mechasism of hyperparasitism involves a parasitic relationship where one organism, typically a fungus, directly attacks another pathogenic fungus. The hyperparasite physically interacts with the host, penetrates its cell wall, and extract nutrients. An example is the hyperparasitic fungus, Cladosporium cladosporioides, which parasitizes Puccinia striiformis f. sp. tritici (Pst), the causal agent of wheat stripe rust.

=== Induction of resistance ===
Induction of resistance in antagonism refers to the ability of an antagonistic bacterium to activate a host's defense mechanisms through biochemical changes, such as the production of pathogenesis-related proteins or antimicrobial compounds, thereby enhancing the plant's immunity locally or systemically against pathogens. For example, Bacillus subtilis induces systemic resistance in plants by triggering the production of pathogenesis-related proteins and antimicrobial compounds, offering protection against fungal pathogens such as Botrytis cinerea.

=== Competition for nutrients and space ===
Competition for resources occurs as antagonistic bacteria colonize the host and outcompete phytopathogens for essential nutrients, such as carbon sources like sucrose, fructose, and glucose, thereby reducing spore germination and the pathogen's ability to invade the host. For example, the yeast antagonist Rhodotorula glutinis deprives pathogens of critical micronutrients, such as iron, by producing siderophores.

== Applications in agriculture ==
Plant diseases are typically managed using synthetic pesticides, however, their use can lead to environmental contamination, reduced biological diversity, the development of resistance in pathogens, and risks to human and animal health. Antagonism plays a critical role in agriculture, particularly in the development of biological control agent (BCAs) to manage phytopathogens and reduce reliance on synthetic pesticides. Numerous microbial antagonists, including yeasts and bacteria, are isolated from diverse environments such as soil, plants, compost, and oceans for their potential to control plant diseases. For example, endophyte microorganisms found inside guarana seeds and rhizospheric soil have shown their ability to fight harmful pathogens, making them promising candidates for BCAs.

BCAs are applied during both preharvest and postharvest stages to protect crops like citrus, bananas, peaches, and strawberries. Preharvest applications of antagonistic microbes, such as Burkholderia spinosa on bananas and Pantoea agglomerans on citrus, have successfully reduced diseases caused by pathogens such as Penicillium digitatum and Colletotrichum acutatum. Additionally, combining BCAs with antimicrobial compounds like chitosan or bicarbonates, has been shown to enhance their effectiveness and increase crop yield.

In postharvest stages, microbial antagonists are applied directly to fruits through spraying or immersion in solutions. Several bacterial strains, including Bacillus subtilis, Pantoea agglomerans, and Serratia plymuthica, have been used successfully to suppress fungal growth and control diseases during storage.

Overall, BCAs provide a sustainable alternative to synthetic pesticides, offering effective plant protection. However, continued research and development are essential to enhance their efficacy and addressing challenges such as high costs and limited commercial viability.
