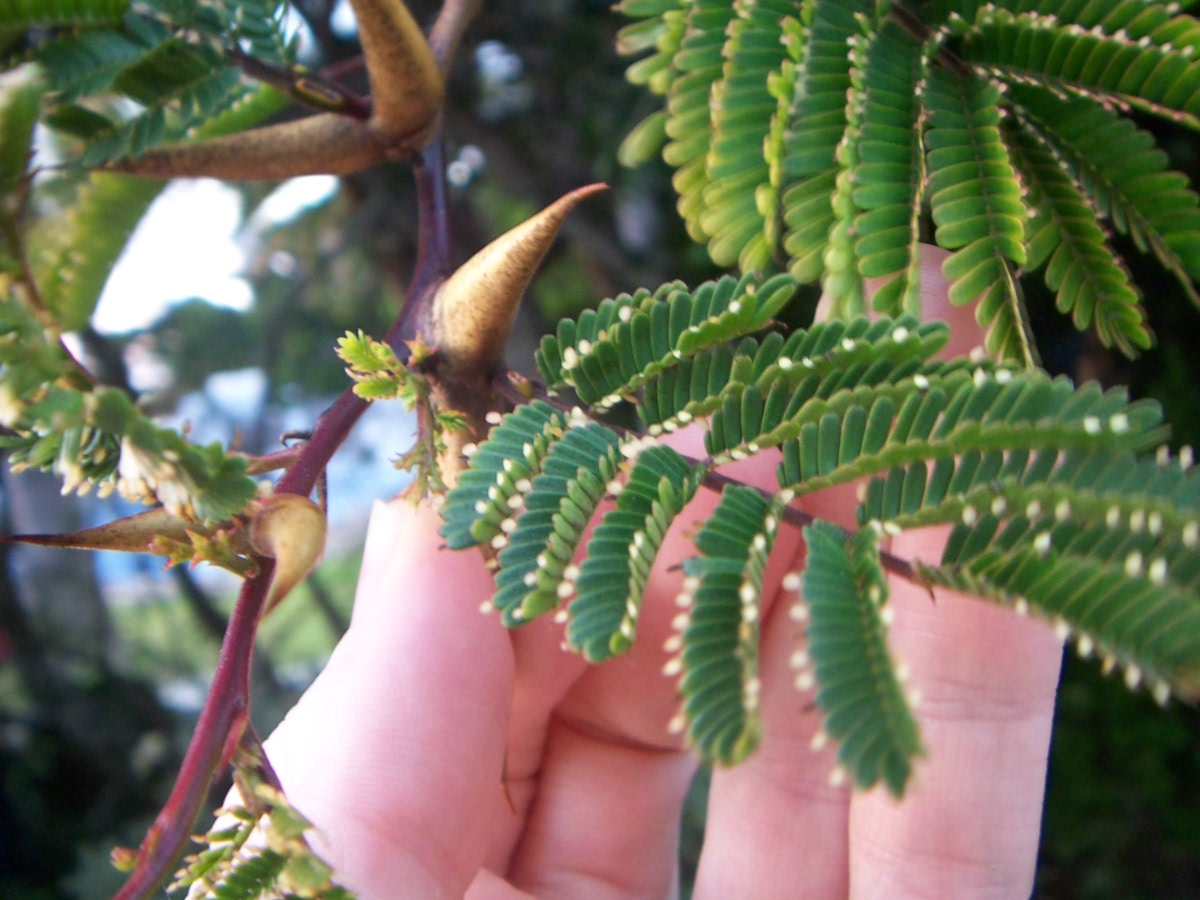

Scientific classification
- Kingdom: Plantae
- Clade: Tracheophytes
- Clade: Angiosperms
- Clade: Eudicots
- Clade: Rosids
- Order: Fabales
- Family: Fabaceae
- Subfamily: Caesalpinioideae
- Clade: Mimosoid clade
- Genus: Vachellia
- Species: V. cornigera

Binomial name
- Vachellia cornigera (L.) Seigler & Ebinger
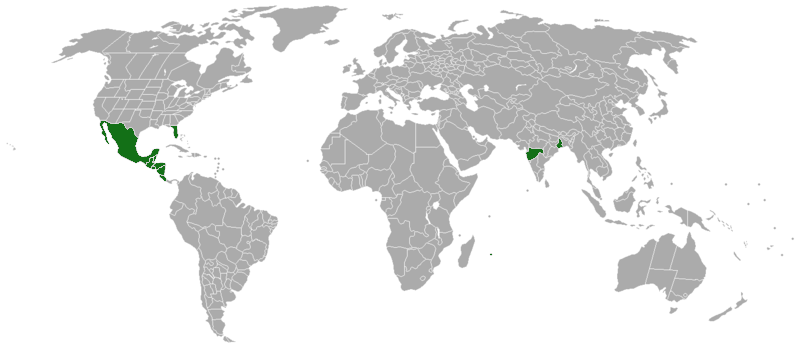
- Range of Vachellia cornigera

Synonyms
- Acacia campecheana Schenck; Acacia cornigera (L.) Willd.; Acacia cornigera var. americana DC.; Acacia cubensis Schenck; Acacia furcella Saff.; Acacia hernandezii Saff.; Acacia interjecta Schenck; Acacia rossiana Schenck; Acacia spadicigera Schldl. & Cham.; Acacia turgida Saff.; Mimosa cornigera L.; Tauroceras cornigerum (L.)Britton & Rose; Tauroceras spadicigerum (Schldl. & Cham.)Britton & Rose

= Vachellia cornigera =

Species of legume

Vachellia cornigera, commonly known as bullhorn acacia (family Fabaceae), is a swollen-thorn tree and myrmecophyte native to Mexico and Central America. The common name of "bullhorn" refers to the enlarged, hollowed-out, swollen thorns (technically called stipular spines) that occur in pairs at the base of leaves, and resemble the horns of a steer. In Yucatán (one region where the bullhorn acacia thrives) it is called "subín", in Panama the locals call them "cachito" (little horn). The trees are commonly found in wet lowlands.

== Morphology ==
Bullhorn acacias are often found as 10 metres (33 ft) trees. Their bark is gray to brown in color and has small furrows. The new growth of the branches is a reddish brown color and is covered in a pubescence, or a covering of small hairs. The leaves are alternate with a pair of stipular spines where the leaf connects to the branch. The spines can vary widely in color from brown, red, and yellow. The spines are home to ants that protect the plant from herbivory. Beltian bodies can be found at the tips of the leaves. They are full of fats and sugars that feed the ants. The tree also produces carbohydrate-rich nectar from glands on its leaf stalk. This type of relationship is called myrmecophily.

== Symbiotic relationship ==
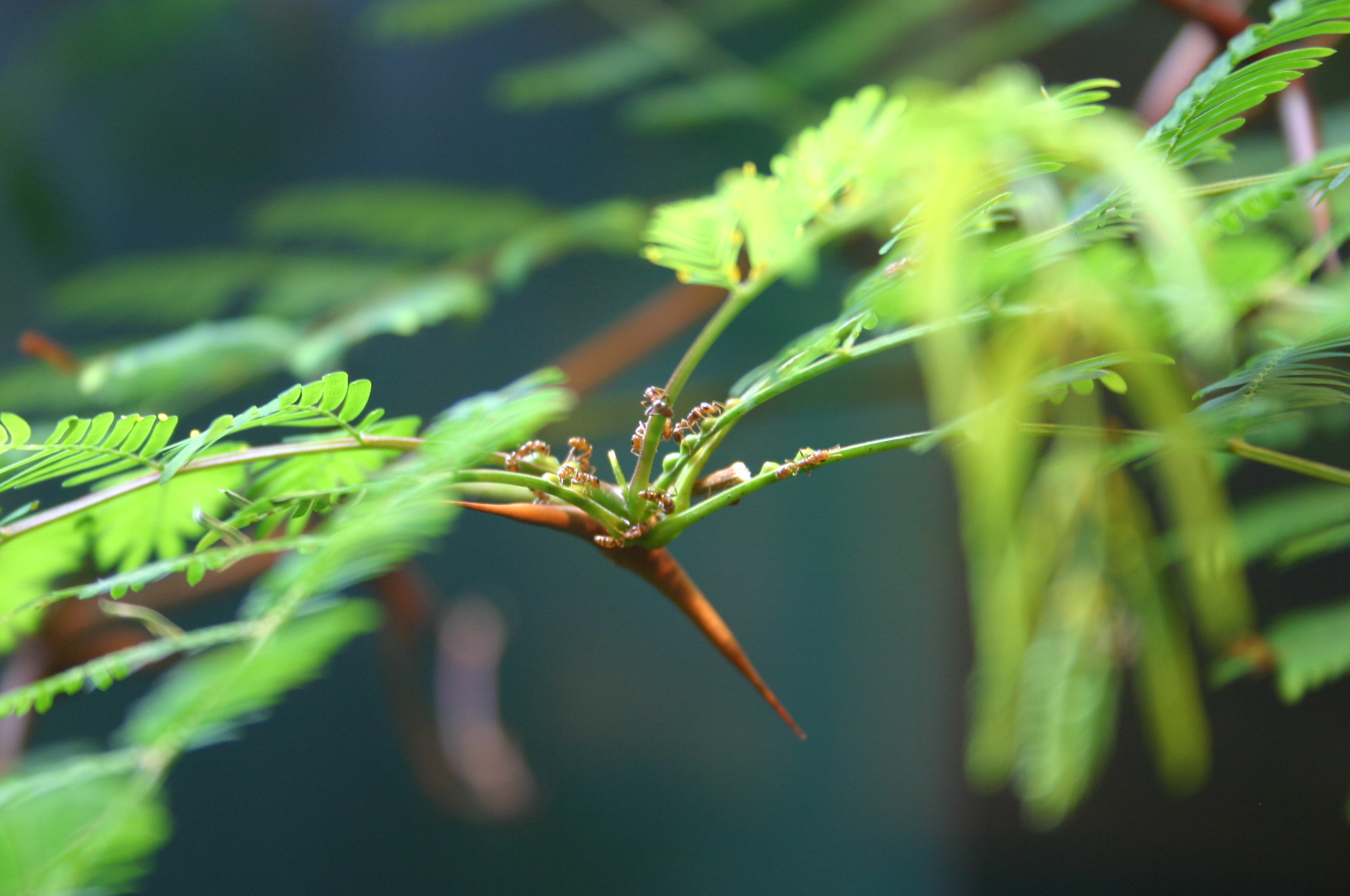
Acacia ants

Bullhorn acacia is best known for its symbiotic relationship with Pseudomyrmex ferruginea, an ant that lives in its hollowed-out thorns. Unlike other acacias, bullhorn acacias are deficient in the bitter alkaloids usually located in the leaves that defend against ravaging insects and animals. Bullhorn acacia ants fulfill that role.

The ants act as a defense mechanism for the tree, protecting it against harmful insects, animals or humans that may come into contact with it. The ants live in the thorns. In return, the tree supplies the ants with Beltian bodies, or protein-lipid nodules, and nectar. These Beltian bodies have no known function other than to provide food for the ants. The aggressive ants release an alarm pheromone and rush out of their thorn "barracks" in great numbers.

According to Daniel Janzen, livestock can apparently smell the pheromone and avoid these acacias day and night. Getting stung in the mouth and tongue is an effective deterrent to browsing on the tender foliage. In addition to protecting V. conigera from leaf-cutting ants and other unwanted herbivores, the ants also clear away invasive seedlings around the base of the tree that might overgrow it and block out vital sunlight.

=== Physiology ===
The physiology of bullhorn acacia (Vachellia cornigera) and P. ferrugineus ant's chemical signalling uses the typical herbivore response signaling pathways expressed in plants. However, the bullhorn acacia extends the function of this signaling to recruit ants to help protect against herbivores. This results in the acacia having an obligate relationship with the P. ferrugineus ants. In this relationship, the plants provide ants with shelter, in the form of swollen stipular spines, food (in the form of protein-lipid-rich beltian bodies) and sugar-secreting extrafloral nectaries. The beltian bodies, small detachable tips on the pinnules of the bullhorn acacia, have evolved into multicellular structures to provide food for protective ant colonies. The P. ferrugineus ants cut small holes in the thorns of the acacia where they lay eggs and care for larvae. These thorns are waterproof and hold in moisture which protects the ants.

The communication between the bullhorn acacia and the ants is mediated by volatiles which arise from damaged vegetation. The major volatile released from crushed leaves was identified via gas chromatography to be trans-2-hexenal. In an experiment by William F. Wood and Brenda J. Wood, solutions of trans-2-hexenal and dichloromethane were placed on bull horn acacia to see if the ants would respond. The results of this were that a statistically significant number of ants displayed more aggravated behavior and swarmed the area with trans-2-hexenal than dichloromethane, proving trans-2-hexenal was the main volatile used by the bullhorn acacia to signal its distress to the ants. Thus, the initial signal of the damage response pathway is the physical damage of the leaf. This leads to a flux in Ca^{2+} levels in the leaf cells, generating a variation potential. The result of the variation potential is the damaged leaves releasing the volatile trans-2-hexenal, which the ants sense and respond to by swarming the damaged area to drive off herbivores.

However, the volatile release in response to damage has a secondary function. A study by Hernández-Zepeda et al. revealed that the release of volatiles corresponded with the activation of the jasmonic acid pathway in plants: a common pathway in plants that activates in response to damage. Furthermore, the application of jasmonic acid to leaves resulted in an increase in extrafloral nectar production by CWIN (an invertase regulator of nectar secretion found in the cell wall). Thus, it can be understood that when damaged, the Bullhorn acacia creates a signal to the ants to defend it while also increasing the production of the ants' food source.

The extrafloral nectaries, which are nectar secreting plant glands, are located on the acacia's petioles and are the location of the food source for the ants. The secreted nectar plays an important role as plant indirect defense through the attraction of defending ants. As long as the plants are inhabited by mutualistic ants, the extrafloral nectar will get secreted with a sharp diurnal peak (between 8-10am). The nectary is the site of nectar synthesis, and the components that get synthesized include sugar, amino acids, and nectarines. The metabolic machinery for the extrafloral nectar production is synthesized and active during secretion then degraded after. Invertase is an enzyme that was found by Orona-Tamayo et al. to play an important role in nectar secretion, as it collects in the nectaries right before secretion, then declines quickly after the secretion.

The nectar secretion from nectaries and food bodies on leaves and shelter (hollow stipular spines at the base of a leaf) is known as swollen plant syndrome. This syndrome is vital to the acacia plant's survival because it facilitates the animal-plant mutualism with the P. ferrugineus ants. However, this syndrome does not develop until several weeks after germination.

It has been reported that swollen thorn syndrome (production of specialized traits in the form of hollow stipular spines, beltian bodies, and extrafloral nectaries) was absent in the early development of the bullhorn acacia. Leichty and Poethig linked the expression of swollen thorn syndrome to a change in the expression of genes in the miR156/miR157 and their corresponding increase in their target SPL transcription factors. Specifically, they found that gradual decline in miRNA156/157 was correlated with gradual increase in length of extrafloral nectaries and an increase in the number of beltian bodies. Furthermore, stipule swelling occurred at the nodes with the lowest levels of these miRNAs. Their results highlight that these traits are controlled by the miR156/miRNA157-SPL pathway, suggesting that this syndrome is an age-dependent (temporally regulated) consequence of genetic regulation and not of passive constraints on development.

In a study by Heil et al. in 2014, the research team found that acacia hosts manipulate their ant inhabitants (Pseudomyrmex) by inhibiting their sucrose invertase. This enzyme breaks down sucrose in the ants. The invertase in the ants is inhibited by an extra floral nectar (EFN) protein chitinase that is in the nectar provided for the ants by the acacia. By binding to the sucrose invertase enzymes in the ants, the chitinase prevents the ants from breaking down sucrose containing sugars. The acacia tree EFN does not contain sucrose so the ants can digest the EFN provided by the acacia but no other sucrose containing nectars. Unknown to the ants, this very source (the EFN) contains the inhibiting chitinase. This manipulation of the ants physiology by acacia ensures the continuation of defense behavior of the ants.

The symbiotic relationship between the bullhorn acacia and P. ferrugineus ants is of a mutualistic nature for both species. This relationship has many physiological factors in both the acacia and ants. The behaviors that arise from these factors are currently known to include: Acacia defense by ants and nectar secretion by acacia resulting in partner manipulation of the ants by the acacia.

== Uses ==
=== Decorative uses ===
The thorns of V. cornigera, are often strung into unusual necklaces and belts. In El Salvador, the horn-shaped thorns provide the legs for small ballerina seed dolls which are worn as decorative pins.

=== Traditional medicine ===
The thorns of V. cornigera are also used in traditional Maya acupuncture.
