= Beltian body =

Nutritious parts of some plants

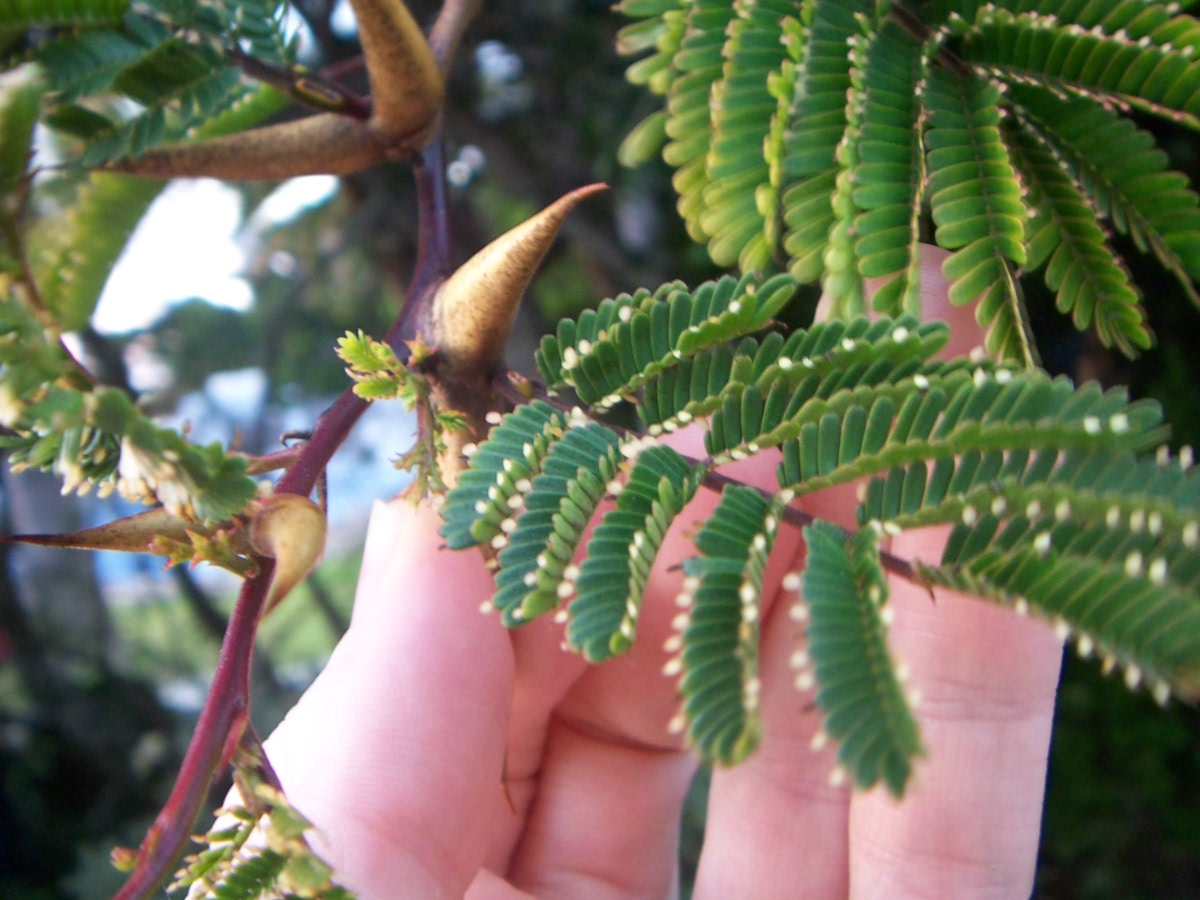
The Beltian bodies of A. cornigera evolved in symbiosis with P. ferruginea.

A Beltian body is a detachable tip found on the pinnules of some species of Acacia and closely related genera. Beltian bodies, named after Thomas Belt, are rich in lipids, sugars and proteins and often red to yellow in colour. They are believed to have evolved in a symbiotic relationship with ants. The ants live inside special plant structures (domatia) or near the plant and keep away herbivores.

Other ant-mutualism related plant structures include Beccarian, Mullerian and pearl bodies.

Unique among spiders for its predominantly herbivorous diet, Bagheera kiplingi feeds almost exclusively on Beltian bodies.

== See also ==
- Plant defence against herbivory
- Elaiosome
- Extrafloral nectaries
