= Vachellia sphaerocephala =

Scientific classification
- Kingdom: Plantae
- Clade: Tracheophytes
- Clade: Angiosperms
- Clade: Eudicots
- Clade: Rosids
- Order: Fabales
- Family: Fabaceae
- Subfamily: Caesalpinioideae
- Clade: Mimosoid clade
- Genus: Vachellia
- Species: V. sphaerocephala

Binomial name
- Vachellia sphaerocephala (Schltdl. & Cham.) Seigler & Ebinger

Synonyms
- Acacia sphaerocephala Schltdl. & Cham.

Species of legume

Vachellia sphaerocephala, the bull's horn thorn or bee wattle, is a plant species in the family Fabaceae. The name comes from the shape of the thorns which do indeed resemble the horns of a bull. The tree has a strong, symbiotic relationship with a species of stinging ant, Pseudomyrmex ferruginea. This tree is endemic to Mexico.
