= Vachellia hindsii =

Conservation status
- Least Concern (IUCN 3.1)

Scientific classification
- Kingdom: Plantae
- Clade: Tracheophytes
- Clade: Angiosperms
- Clade: Eudicots
- Clade: Rosids
- Order: Fabales
- Family: Fabaceae
- Subfamily: Caesalpinioideae
- Clade: Mimosoid clade
- Genus: Vachellia
- Species: V. hindsii

Binomial name
- Vachellia hindsii (Bentham) Seigler & Ebinger

Synonyms
- Acacia bursaria Schenck; Acacia hindsii Bentham; Acacia sinaloensis Saff.; Acacia tepicana Saff.; Myrmecodendron hindsii (Benth.) Britton & Rose

Species of legume

Vachellia hindsii is a tree which grows up to 13 metres (43 ft) tall, and is native to parts of southern Mexico and parts of Central America.
