= Vachellia chiapensis =

Conservation status
- Least Concern (IUCN 2.3)

Scientific classification
- Kingdom: Plantae
- Clade: Tracheophytes
- Clade: Angiosperms
- Clade: Eudicots
- Clade: Rosids
- Order: Fabales
- Family: Fabaceae
- Subfamily: Caesalpinioideae
- Clade: Mimosoid clade
- Genus: Vachellia
- Species: V. chiapensis

Binomial name
- Vachellia chiapensis (Saff.) Seigler & Ebinger

Synonyms
- Acacia chiapensis Saff.

Species of legume

Vachellia chiapensis is a species of leguminous tree in the family Fabaceae. It is found only in Mexico.
