= Shannon B. Olsson =

Chemical Ecologist (born 1977)

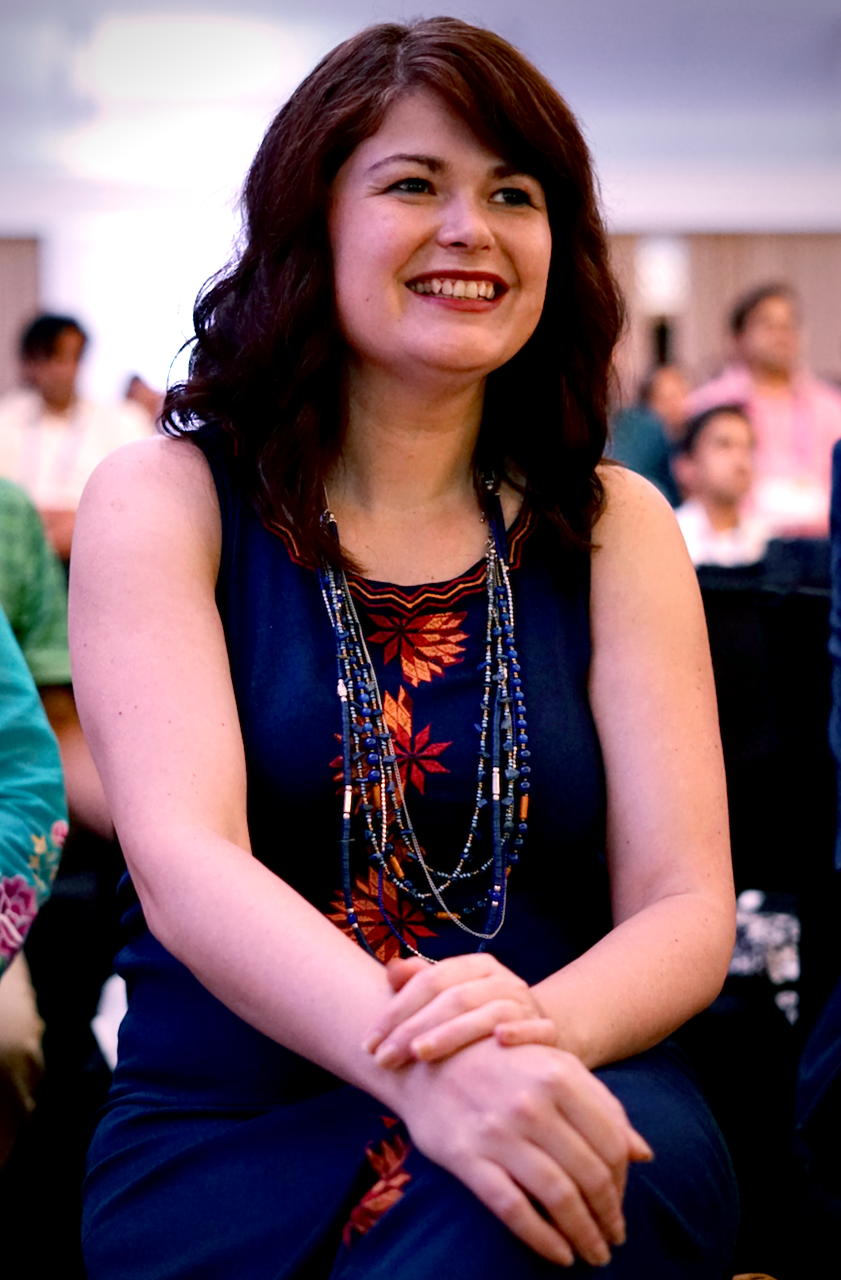
- Shannon Olsson at the INK Conference in Goa, India 2016.
- Born: 18 July 1977 (age 49)
- Education: Nazareth College (New York); Cornell University
- Awards: Fulbright Program; INK Fellow; Ramanujan Fellowship
- Scientific career
- Fields: Chemical Ecology
- Thesis: The scent of speciation (2005)
- Doctoral advisor: Thomas Eisner; Wendell L. Roelofs
- Website: www.shannonolsson.com

Shannon B. Olsson (born Bice, 18 July 1977) is a scientist working on chemical ecology and sustainability, particularly in the context of Indian ecosystems. Olsson is the founder and Global Director of the echo network, a "science with society" network crossing 45 countries. She serves through the echo network's international hub as Special Scientific Envoy to India with the Danish Academy of Technical Sciences (ATV) in close collaboration with the Innovation Centre Denmark in India (under the auspices of the MFA Denmark and the Ministry of Higher Education and Science (Denmark)). She previously served as a project leader at the Max Planck Institute for Chemical Ecology in Jena, Germany, and then a faculty member of the National Centre for Biological Sciences, Tata Institute of Fundamental Research in Bangalore, India.

== Early life and education ==
Olsson was born Shannon Bryn Bice to Norman Allen Bice and Joyce Elaine Parish in De Peyster, New York. Olsson was educated at Heuvelton Central School in Heuvelton, New York. She went on to study at Nazareth College (New York) where she received her Bachelor of Science degree in chemistry with secondary science education in 1999. Olsson was awarded a PhD in 2005 in the Department of Neurobiology and Behavior at Cornell University with a specialization in Chemical Ecology under the supervision of Professors Thomas Eisner and Wendell L. Roelofs. Her dissertation research examined the chemosensory basis for sympatric host shifts in Rhagoletis pomonella. She was awarded the "Distinguished Alumni Award" from Heuvelton Central School, the "Graduate of the Last Decade" by Nazareth College, and her summer research at Clarkson University with Professor Yuzhuo Li was featured at the United States Capitol for the Council on Undergraduate Research "Posters on the Hill" event. Following her undergraduate studies, Olsson was awarded a Fulbright Fellowship to Lund University where she conducted research in neuroethology under Bill Hansson. Afterward, she began her graduate studies at Cornell University, and in 2006–2007 conducted postdoctoral research at the University of California, Los Angeles on the chemical ecology of marine invertebrates in California kelp forests.

== Career ==
In 2007, she began her professional career as a Project Leader for the EU-funded program "Biosynthetic Infochemical Communication" at the Max Planck Institute for Chemical Ecology in Jena, Germany.

In 2014, Olsson joined the faculty of the National Centre for Biological Sciences (NCBS) at the Tata Institute of Fundamental Research in Bangalore, India, promoting chemical ecology across Indian ecosystems. At NCBS, Olsson also started the Naturalist-Inspired Chemical Ecology (NICE) Group, which combines naturalist approaches with modern tools from chemistry, molecular biology, ecology, and neuroscience to examine how organisms use chemicals to interact with each other and identify relevant objects in their environment.

Olsson's research has addressed topics as including chemical communication in the Indian antelope blackbuck ecological agriculture in India's coffee plantations, the impact of air pollution on our wild animals and insects, the effect of environmental change on our ecosystem services, a global study linking COVID-19 with smell and taste impairment, and a multimodal virtual reality arena for insects.

=== the echo network ===
In 2019, Olsson founded the echo network, a cross-sector public-private partnership to address current issues in human and environmental sustainabiliity, first in India, and eventually worldwide. The network was initiated by the Principal Scientific Adviser to the Government of India, K. VijayRaghavan, on 19 December 2019, with Bill and Melinda Gates Foundation, Hindustan Unilever Limited, RoundGlass Foundation, India Climate Collaborative, Ashoka Trust for Research in Ecology and the Environment (ATREE), and the Centre for Cellular and Molecular Platforms (C-CAMP) as founding partners. As of April 2023, the echo network has over 2100 members crossing 45 countries. Olsson has stated "The concept of echo network is to create a mechanism for organisations and people from different sectors to work together along with academia and use science and technology to create sustainable communities."

In 2022, Olsson was appointed as "Special Scientific Envoy to India" with the Danish Academy of Technical Sciences (ATV) in close collaboration with the Innovation Centre Denmark in India (under the auspices of the MFA Denmark and the Ministry of Higher Education and Science (Denmark)). This is supported by the Novo Nordisk Foundation. She is also a founding member of Ecosystem-based Adaptation for Resilient Incomes (ECOBARI), and the Biodiversity Collaborative. In 2021, she co-founded Citizen Science for Biodiversity (CitSci India), and co-organizes their yearly conference. She is also an advisor ("Guru") for the Future Climate Leaders Programme and is on the advisory committee for the Research and Innovation Circle of Hyderabad (RICH).\

=== Public speaking ===
Olsson has given public speeches for TEDx. Her work has also appeared in the Science Gallery Dublin, Ireland, The Victoria and Albert Museum in London, UK, and the Department of Science and Technology (India) Science Express train. In 2023, she spoke at the 59th Nobel Conference.

== Awards and recognition ==
For her scientific work, Olsson has been awarded a United Nations Pinning for Research Excellence by Ghandian Scholars and is a Ramanujan Fellow. Olsson's research has been featured by CNN, Nature (journal), Science (journal), Inverse (website), Haaretz, USA Today, Chemical and Engineering News, The Conversation (website), and The Hindu, among many other international news outlets.

Olsson was named an INK Fellow in 2016. For her efforts in sustainability, Olsson was recognized as one of "75 Women in STEAM in India".
