= Baldwyn Torto =

Ghanaian chemical ecologist

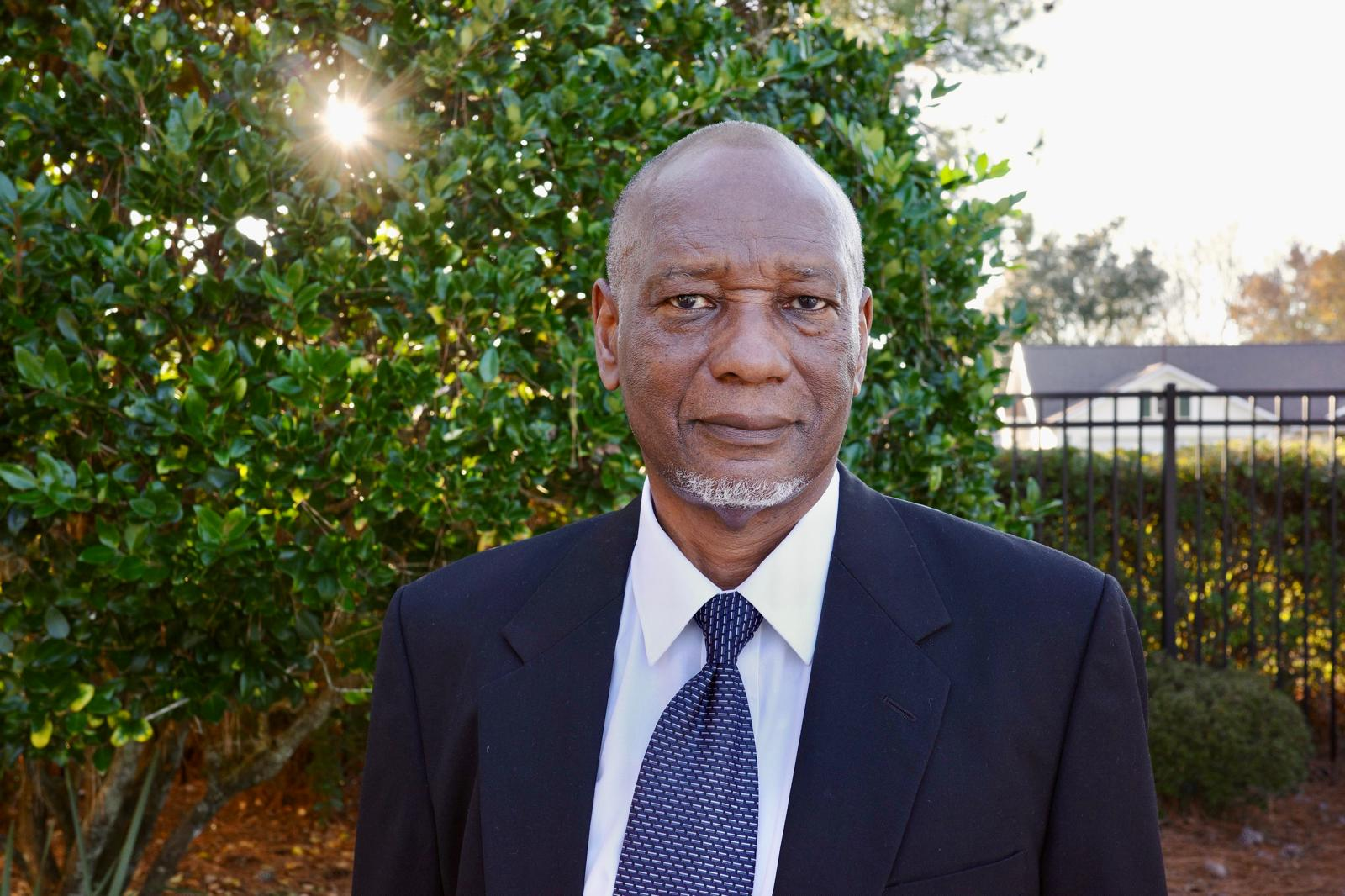
- Born: Baldwyn Torto; 1955 (age 70–71)
- Citizenship: Ghana
- Education: University of Ghana University of Maine
- Scientific career
- Fields: Biochemistry; Chemical ecology; Organic Chemistry
- Workplaces: ICIPE University of Pretoria

Baldwyn Torto is a Ghanaian chemical ecologist, and the first natural scientist from Ghana to be elected as an International Member of the United States National Academy of Sciences in 2023 for groundbreaking discoveries in chemical ecology. His work has opened new pathways for vector control and the monitoring of crop pests and other insects. He is an ARS Distinguished Visiting Scientist, and an Emeritus Fellow at the International Centre of Insect Physiology and Ecology (ICIPE), where he previously served as a principal scientist and head of the Behavioural and Chemical Ecology Unit. Additionally, he holds a position as an extraordinary professor in the Department of Zoology and Entomology at the University of Pretoria, South Africa. He became a fellow of the African Academy of Sciences in 2013, and a fellow of the Entomological Society of America in 2016. He is a member of the American Chemical Society and was once a Councilor for the International Society of Chemical Ecology.

== Early life and education ==
Torto was born in Accra in 1955. He obtained his Bachelor of Science with honors degree in Chemistry and Biochemistry from the University of Ghana in 1979, and master's degree in natural product chemistry under the mentorship of Prof. Ivan Addae-Mensah FGA in 1982 from the same university. In 1985, he was the first African to be trained in chemical ecology at ICIPE and worked on the chemical basis of sorghum-stem borer interactions under the mentorship of Prof. Ahmed Hassanali FAAS and graduated with a doctorate degree at the University of Ghana in 1988.

== Career and Research ==
Following his postdoctoral research in organic chemistry under the mentorship of Professor Michael D. Bentley and Professor Barbara J.W. Cole at the University of Maine, Torto joined ICIPE as a Scientist in 1991. In 2000, he became a senior scientist and a Rothamsted International Fellow under the mentorship of Professor John A. Pickett FRS, at the Rothamsted Research in the United Kingdom. A year later, he was a visiting scientist under the mentorship of Professor James H. Tumlinson NAS and Dr. Peter E. A. Teal at the USDA/ARS-Centre for Medical, Agriculture and Veterinary Entomology in Gainesville, Florida. He worked in this capacity collaborating with colleagues at CMAVE, Professor Drion G. Boucias, University of Florida, and Professor Marla Spivak, University of Minnesota, on the semiochemical management of honey bee pests until 2006. A year later, he returned to ICIPE as a research leader and principal scientist. He was responsible for the Behavioural and Chemical Ecology Unit (BCEU). Torto works with the University of Pretoria as an extraordinary Professor.

Torto is credited for 240 publications, and his works have been cited over 8,000 times. His research interests are in the field of chemical ecology application to sustainable agriculture, veterinary, public health and the environment and has identified semiochemicals for the management of locusts, fruit flies, plant parasitic nematodes, spider mites, legume pests, and invasive species including the south American tomato pinworm and potato cyst nematode. Others include vectors of infectious diseases such as malaria, dengue, Rift Valley Fever, leishmaniasis, and trypanosomosis.

He serves on the editorial committees of the Annual Review of Entomology and Current Opinion in Insect Science. Currently, he is Chief Specialty Editor for Vector Biology in Frontiers in Tropical Diseases, and Associate Editor for the Journal of Chemical Ecology and has previously held similar roles for Proceedings of the Royal Society B: Biological Sciences, and Pest Management Science. He has also served as an advisory board member of the Journal of Agricultural and Food Chemistry.

== Honours ==
In 2023, Torto was elected International Member of the National Academy of Sciences (United States); in 2016, elected fellow of the Entomological Society of America; and in 2013, elected fellow of the African Academy of Sciences. He was the recipient of the 2020 icipe@50 Achievement Award for his scientific research and immense contribution to the training of the next generation of African scientists, the Nan-Yao Su Award for Innovation and Creativity in Entomology of the Entomological Society of America in 2019. In 2018, he was awarded the Louis Malassis International Prize for Food and Agriculture for Outstanding Career in Agricultural Development by the Agropolis Foundation in France, and in 2017, he was honoured by the Journal of Agricultural and Food Chemistry (AGRO-division, American Chemical Society) with the Journal Article of the Year prize. That same year, he was named by the South African Department of Science and Technology as one of the top 50 scientists in Africa.

Torto has delivered many plenary and keynote presentations at various conferences, some of these conferences include 75th International Symposium on Crop Protection, 13th Arab Congress of Plant Protection, International Society of Chemical Ecology, the XXV 2016 International Congress of Entomology, Orlando, Florida, 13th Arbovirus and Mosquito Workshop and NE1443 Regional Project Workshop, USA and the General assembly of the African Academy of Sciences.

He served on the Jury of the Falling Walls Foundation Breakthroughs for Life Sciences, Berlin (2022-2024) and he is on the board of trustees of the JRS Biodiversity Foundation and became its president in 2020. He is a reviewer for research grants for many organizations across the globe.

== Personal life ==
Torto is married to Rita, an animal physiologist. Together, they have three sons. His hobbies include cooking, gardening, and playing the guitar.
