= Chemical ecology =

Study of chemically-mediated interactions between living organisms

Chemical ecology is a vast and interdisciplinary field utilizing biochemistry, biology, ecology, and organic chemistry for explaining observed interactions of living things and their environment through chemical compounds (e.g. ecosystem resilience and biodiversity). Early examples of the field trace back to experiments with the same plant genus in different environments, interaction of plants and butterflies, and the behavioral effect of catnip. Chemical ecologists seek to identify the specific molecules (i.e. semiochemicals) that function as signals mediating community or ecosystem processes and to understand the evolution of these signals. The chemicals behind such roles are typically small, readily-diffusible organic molecules that act over various distances that are dependent on the environment (i.e. terrestrial or aquatic) but can also include larger molecules and small peptides.

In practice, chemical ecology relies on chromatographic techniques, such as thin-layer chromatography, high performance liquid chromatography, gas chromatography, mass spectrometry (MS), and absolute configuration utilizing nuclear magnetic resonance (NMR) to isolate and identify bioactive metabolites. To identify molecules with the sought-after activity, chemical ecologists often make use of bioassay-guided fractionation. Today, chemical ecologists also incorporate genetic and genomic techniques to understand the biosynthetic and signal transduction pathways underlying chemically mediated interactions.

== Plant, microbe and insect chemical ecology ==
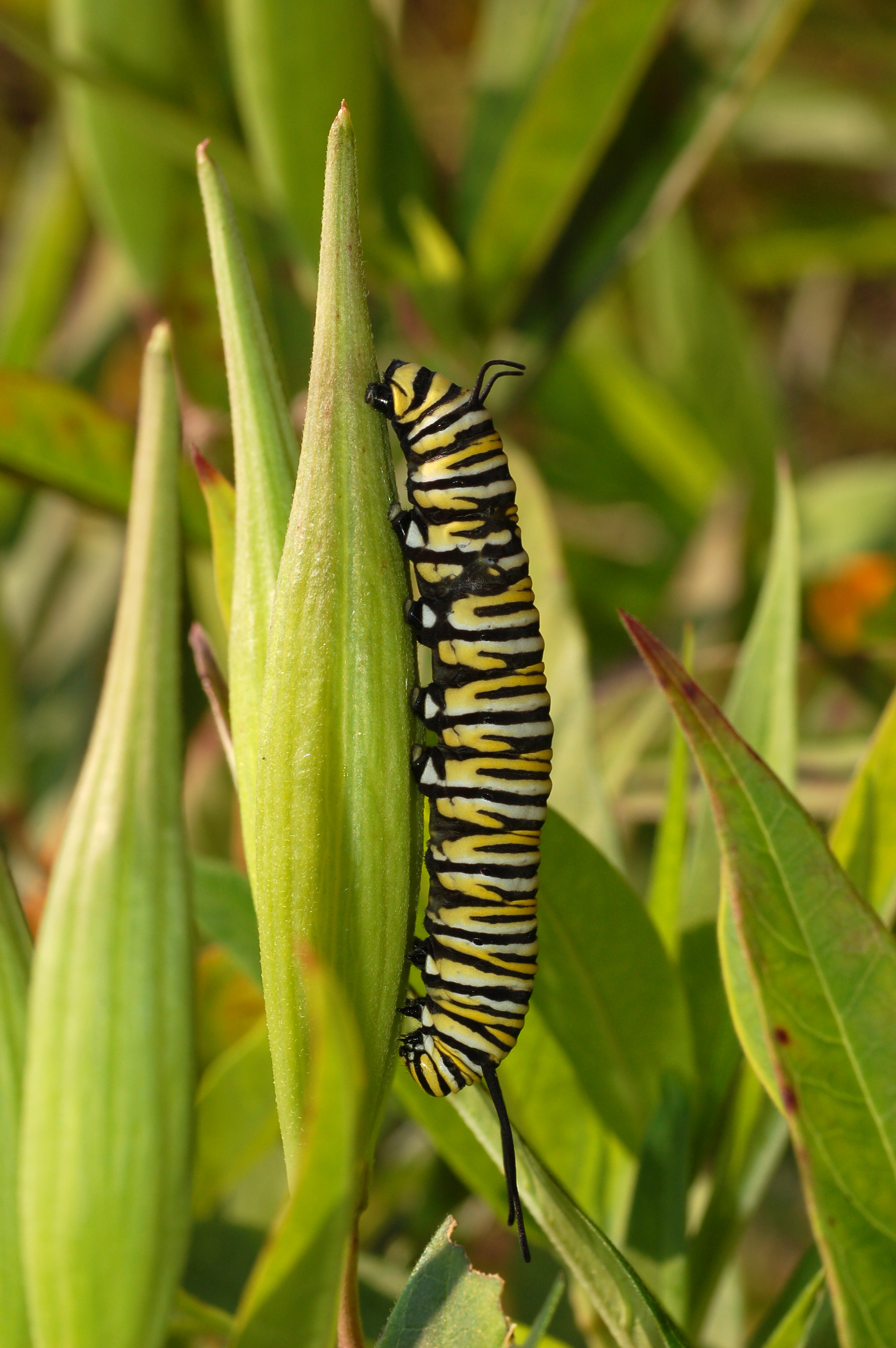
Monarch butterfly caterpillar on milkweed plant.

Plant, microbe, and insect chemical ecology focuses on the role of chemical cues and signals in mediating interactions with their abiotic (e.g. ability of some bacterium to reduce metals in the surrounding environment) and biotic environment (e.g. microorganisms, phytophagous insects, and pollinators). Cues allow for organisms to monitor interactions with the environment and to adjust accordingly through changes in chemical abundance as a response. Changes in compound abundance allows for defensive measures to be enacted, e.g. attracts for predators.

=== Plant-insect interactions ===
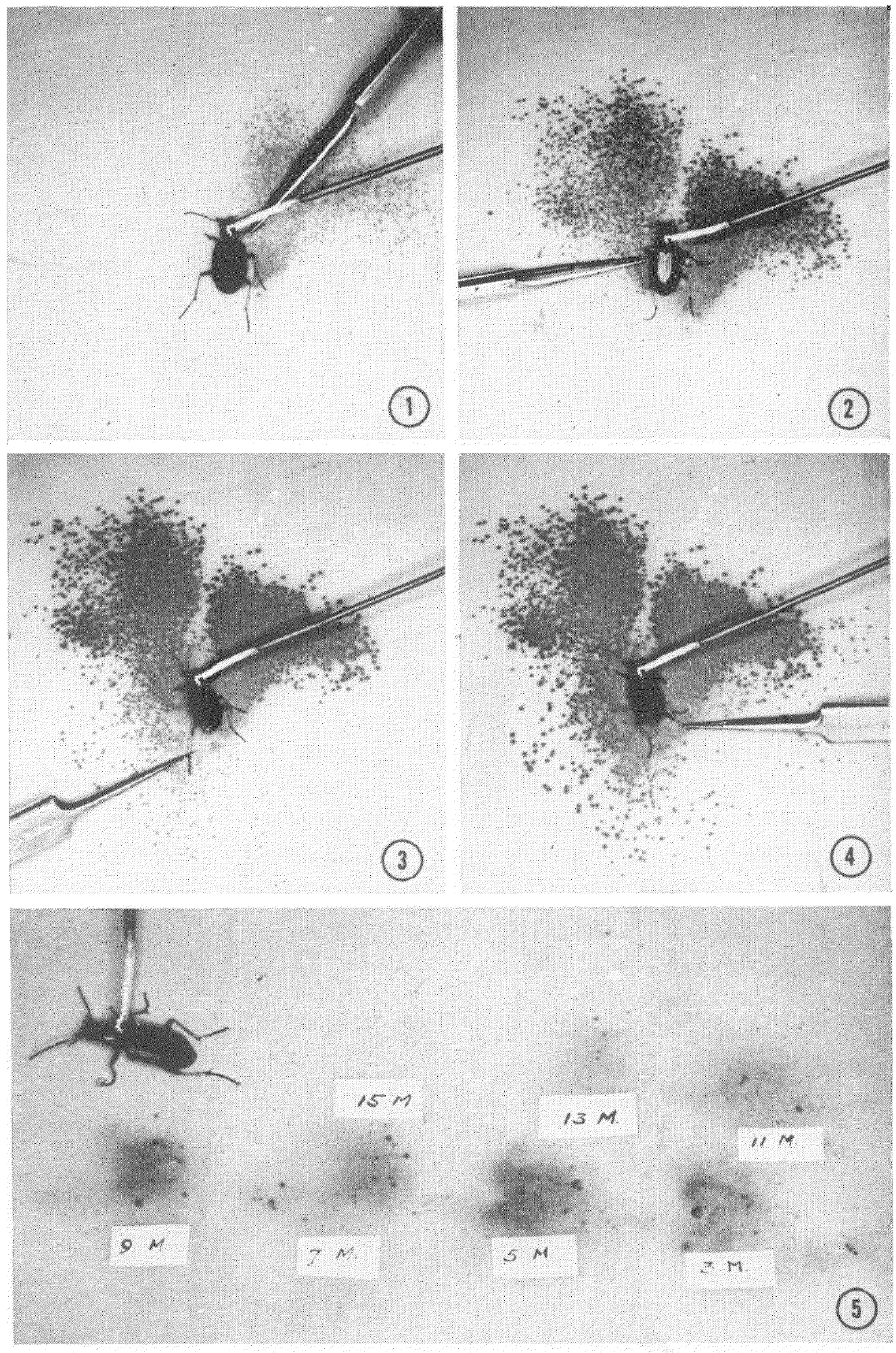
Series from a study by Eisner and colleagues investigating defensive spray in bombardier beetles. The paper is specially treated to have a color reaction with the spray, which is normally clear.

The chemical ecology of plant-insect interaction is a significant subfield of chemical ecology. In particular, plants and insects are often involved in a chemical evolutionary arms race. As plants develop chemical defenses to herbivory, insects which feed on them co-evolved to develop immunity to these poisons, and in some cases, repurpose these poisons for their own chemical defense against predators. For example, caterpillars of the monarch butterfly sequester cardenolide toxins from their milkweed host-plants and are able to use them as an anti-predator defense. Whereas most insects are killed by cardenolides, which are potent inhibitors of the Na+/K+-ATPase, monarchs have evolved resistance to the toxin over their long evolutionary history with milkweeds. Other examples of sequestration include the tobacco hornworm Manduca sexta, which use nicotine sequestered from tobacco plants in predator defense; and the bella moth, which secretes a quinone-containing froth to deter predators obtained from feeding on Crotalaria plants as a caterpillar.

Chemical ecologists also study chemical interactions involved in indirect defenses of plants, such as the attraction of predators and parasitoids through herbivore-induced volatile organic compounds (VOCs).

=== Plant-microbe interactions ===
Plant interactions with microorganisms are also mediated by chemistry. Both constitutive and induced secondary metabolites (specialized metabolites in modern terminology) are involved in plant defense against pathogens and chemical signals are also important in the establishment and maintenance of resource mutualisms. For example, both rhizobia and mycorrhizae depend on chemical signals, such as strigolactones and flavanoids exuded from plant roots, in order to find a suitable host.

For microbes to gain access to the plant, they must be able to penetrate the layer of wax that forms a hydrophobic barrier on the plant's surface. Many plant-pathogenic microbes secrete enzymes that break down these cuticular waxes. Mutualistic microbes on the other hand may be granted access. For example, rhizobia secrete Nod factors that trigger the formation of an infection thread in receptive plants. The rhizobial symbionts can then travel through this infection thread to gain entrance to root cells.

Mycorrhizae and other fungal endophytes may also benefit their host plants by producing antibiotics or other secondary metabolites that ward off harmful fungi, bacteria and herbivores in the soil. Some entomopathogenic fungi can also form endophytic relationships with plants and may even transfer nitrogen directly to plants from insects they consume in the surrounding soil.

=== Plant-plant interactions ===
==== Allelopathy ====
Allelopathy is a sub-field of chemical ecology which focuses on secondary (known as allelochemicals) produced by plants or microorganisms that can inhibit the growth and formation of neighboring plants or microorganisms within the natural community. Many examples of allelopathic competition have been controversial due to the difficulty of positively demonstrating a causal link between allelopathic substances and plant performance under natural conditions, but it is widely accepted that phytochemicals are involved in competitive interactions between plants. One of the clearest examples of allelopathy is the production of juglone by walnut trees, whose strong competitive effects on neighboring plants were recognized in the ancient world as early as 36 BC. Allelopathic compounds have also become an interest in agriculture as an alternative to weed management over synthetic herbicides, e.g. wheat production.

==== Plant-plant communication ====
Plants communicate with each other through both airborne and below-ground chemical cues. For example, when damaged by an herbivore, many plants emit an altered bouquet of volatile organic compounds (VOCs). Various C6 fatty acids and alcohols (sometimes known as green leaf volatiles) are often emitted from damaged leaves, since they are break-down products of plant cell membranes. These compounds (familiar to many as the smell of freshly mown grass) can be perceived by neighboring plants where they may trigger the induction of plant defenses. It is debated to what extent this communication reflects a history of active selection due to mutual benefit as opposed to "eavesdropping" on cues unintentionally emitted by neighboring plants.

=== Insect-reptile/amphibian interactions ===
Further information: predator-prey arms race

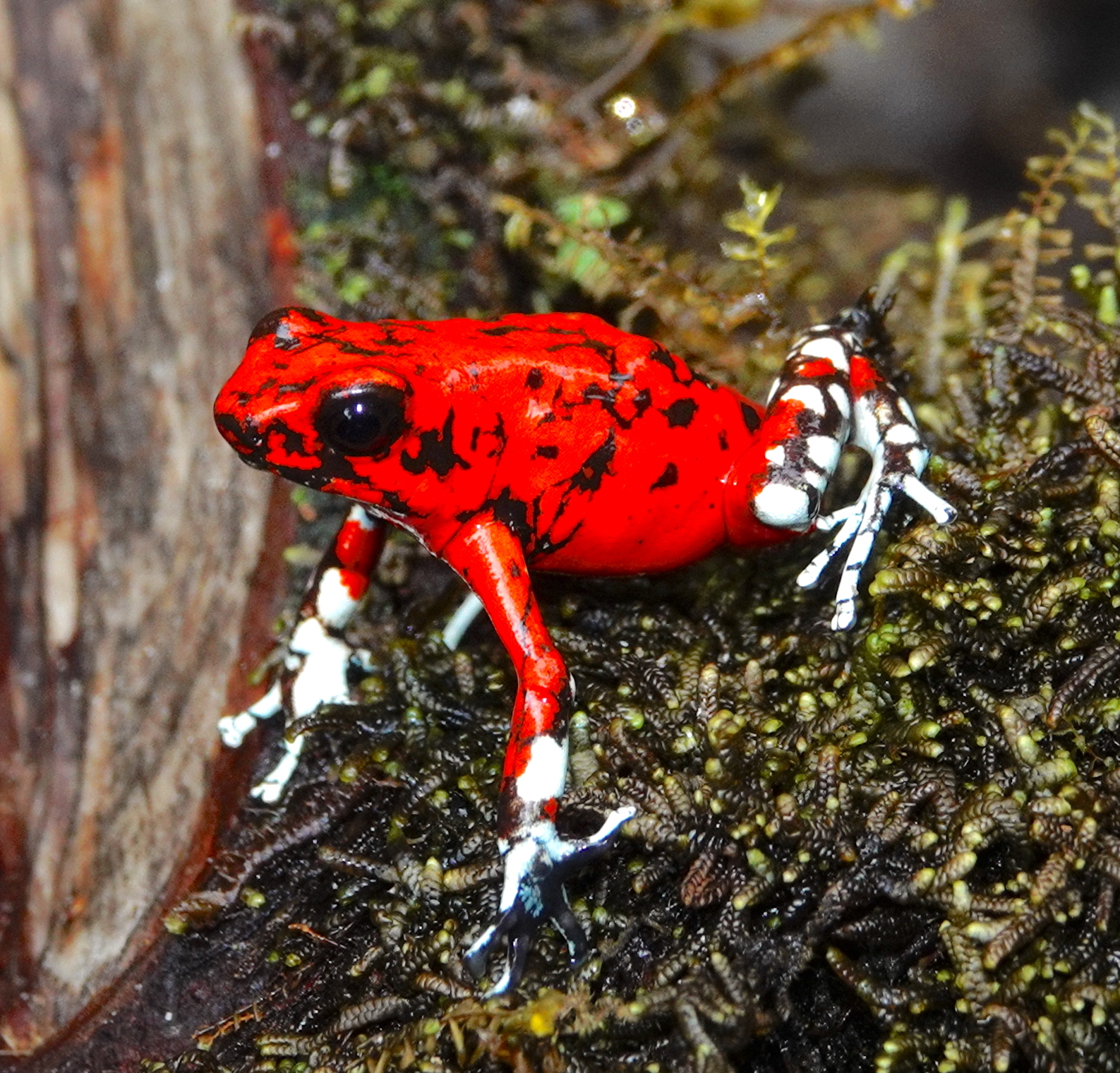
Diablito poison frog (Oophaga sylvatica)

Reptiles interaction also contribute to chemical ecology via bioaccumulation or neutralization of toxic compounds. Diablito poison frog (Oophaga sylvatica) which feeds on leaf litter arthropods sequesters the poison cardenolides with no self harm. Species of dart frogs have evolved in similar fashion to the insects they consume via modification to their Na+/K+-ATPase. Again, similar to the insects they prey upon, the dart frog physiology has changed to allow for secretion of toxic chemicals such as batrachotoxins found on the skin of certain neotropical dendrobatid frogs. Modification to the Na+/K+-ATPase illustrates a co-evolution based on a predator-prey arms race where each must keep evolving to survive. Another example is the interactions between the horned lizards (Phrynosoma spp.) and harvester ants (Pogonomyrmex spp.). Horned lizards evolution has shown the blood contains a factor that metabolizes toxins produced by harvester ants. The metabolized poison is broken down and used in a specialized blood squirting defensive mechanism to defend the horned lizard against predators.

=== Insect-mammal interactions ===
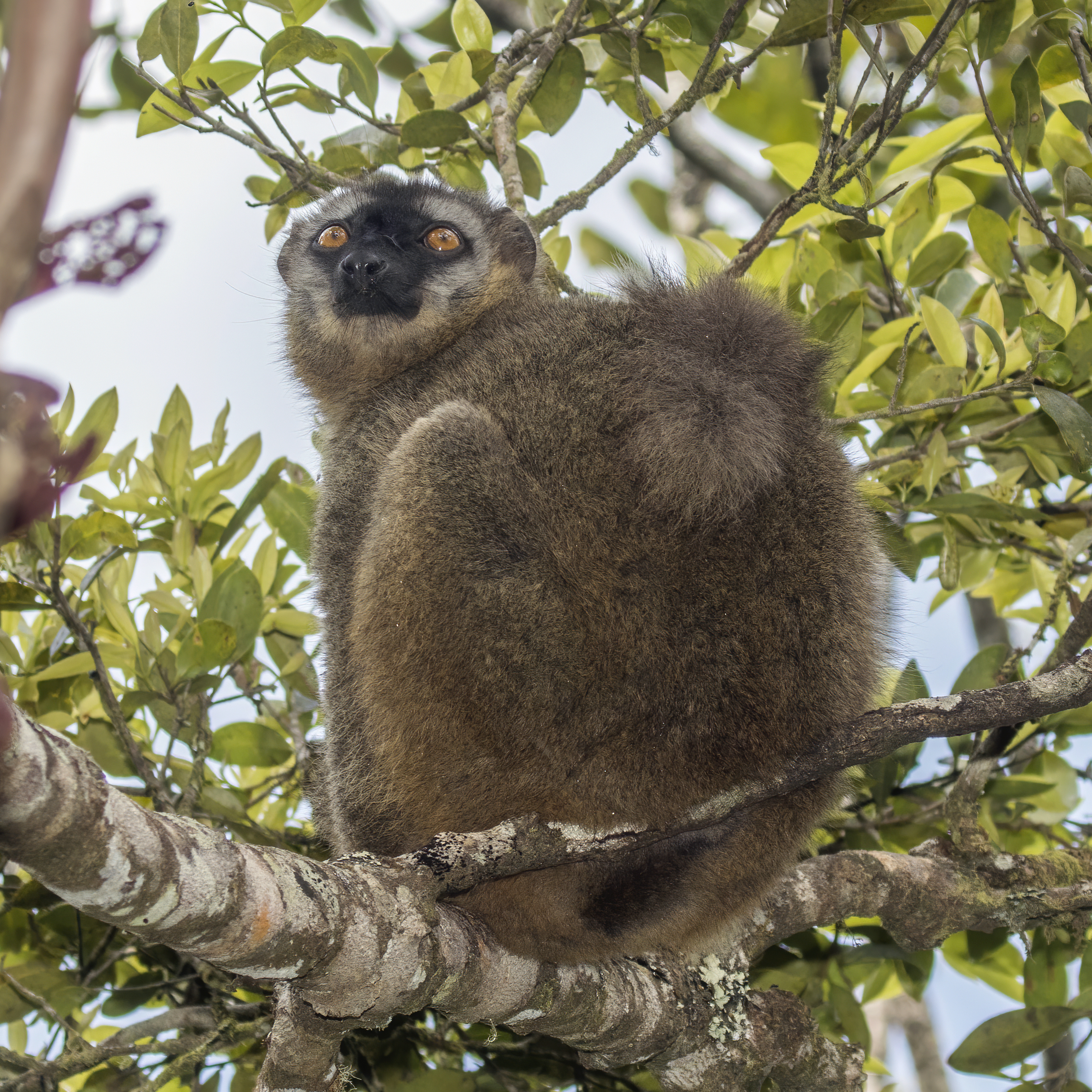
Red-fronted lemurs (Eulemur ruffrons)

Mammals such as lemurs and monkeys demonstrate application of chemicals similar to how humans use chemicals for pest management and medical use. These applications vary from prevention of internal and external parasites or pathogens, decrease likelihood of infection, increase reproductive function, reducing inflammation, social cues, and more. Red-fronted lemurs (Eulemur ruffrons) have evolved two pathways, preventive measure for avoiding bioaccumulation, allowing for the modification of 2-methyl-1,4-benzoquinone and 2-methoxy-3-methyl-1,4-benzoquinone a secretion of Spirostreptidae millipedes shown to inhibit certain bacterial species. Red-fronted lemurs have also been observed in rubbing the secretion on their fur similar to capuchins, this action uses benzoquinone compounds as repellent for various insects such as ticks and mosquitoes.

== Marine chemical ecology ==
=== Defense ===
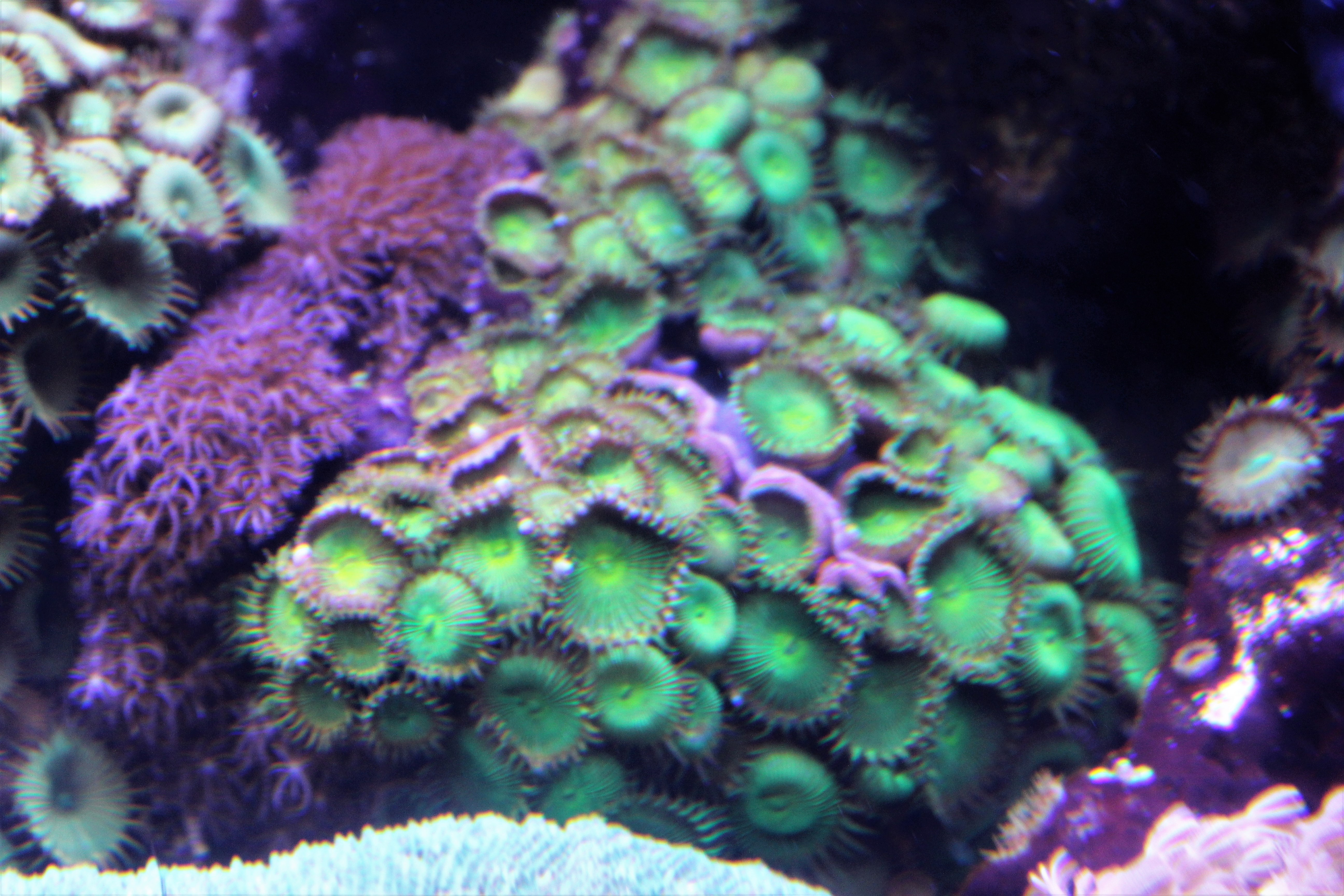
Zoanthus sociatus produces palytoxin

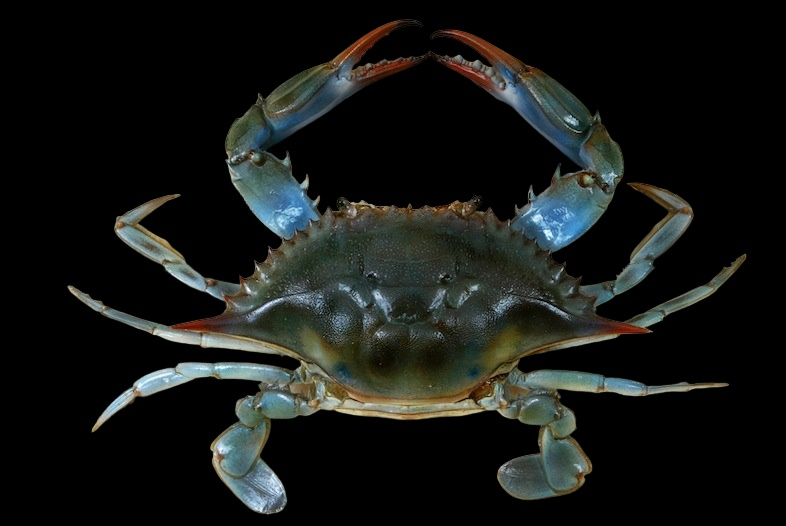
Blue crab (detects urine of predators)

Counter shading depicted by a bobtail squid in comparison to a non light producing marine organism.

Many marine organisms use chemical defenses to deter predators. For example, some crustaceans and mesograzers, such as the Pseudamphithoides incurvaria, use toxic algae and seaweeds as a shield against predation by covering their bodies in these plants. These plants produce phycotoxins, diterpenes such as pachydictyol-A and dictyol-E, which have been shown to deter predators. Demonstrating this symbiotic relationship are cyanobacteria and shrimp. The snapping shrimp Alpheus frontalis has been observed in utilizing Moorena bouillonii, a cyanobacterium, for shelter and food. M. bouillonii produces compounds that are toxic to other marine organisms and coral but its relationship with A. frontalis demonstrates the use of M. bouillonii as a deterrent and shelter to protect A. frontalis. Other marine organisms produce chemicals endogenously to defend themselves. For example, the finless sole (Pardachirus marmoratus) produces a toxin that paralyzes the jaws of would-be predators. Many zoanthids produce potent toxins, such as palytoxin, which is one of the most poisonous known substances. Some species of these zooanthids are very brightly colored, which may be indicative of aposematic defense.

Another defensive measure that involves chemical ecology and marine ecology is the bobtail squid's light organ. The bobtail which is located in Hawaii contains a light organ that houses consumed bacterium Vibrio fischeri, V. fisheri bacterium utilizes quorum sensing to indicate expression for bioluminescence, for down welling light intensity. Down welling light intensity allows the bobtail squid to hide from predators by mimicking moonlight and starlight intensity as it hunts for prey at night. There is also development of blue crab defense, which utilizes sensory organs for detecting chemical changes in the water to alert them of predators. When alerted blue crabs will hide as a defensive strategy. The urine from predators acts as a selective pressure so that blue crabs which are more sensitive to chemical change are likely to survive. Those that survive increase the likelihood that offspring develop the same sensory organs for detection. However, there is a distinctive difference between development of the sensory organs, ability to process or accumulate toxins or bacteria compared to leaned or habit developing defensive strategy.

=== Reproduction ===
Many marine organisms use pheromones as chemical cues alerting possible mates that they are ready to reproduce. For example, male sea lampreys attract ovulating females by emitting a bile that can be detected many meters downstream. Other processes can be more complex, such as the mating habits of crabs. Due to the fact that female crabs can only mate during a short period after moults from her shell, female crabs produces pheromones before she begins to moult in order to attract a mate. Male crabs will detect these pheromones and defend their potential mate until she has finished molted. However, due to the cannibalistic tendencies of crabs, the female produces an additional pheromone to suppresses cannibalistic instincts in her male guardian. These pheromones are very potent—so much so that they can induce male crabs to try to copulate with rocks or sponges that have been coated in pheromone by researchers. Furthermore, compound structure plays a key role, e.g. crab pheromones are specialized to travel in aquatic vs terrestrial environments.

=== Dominance ===
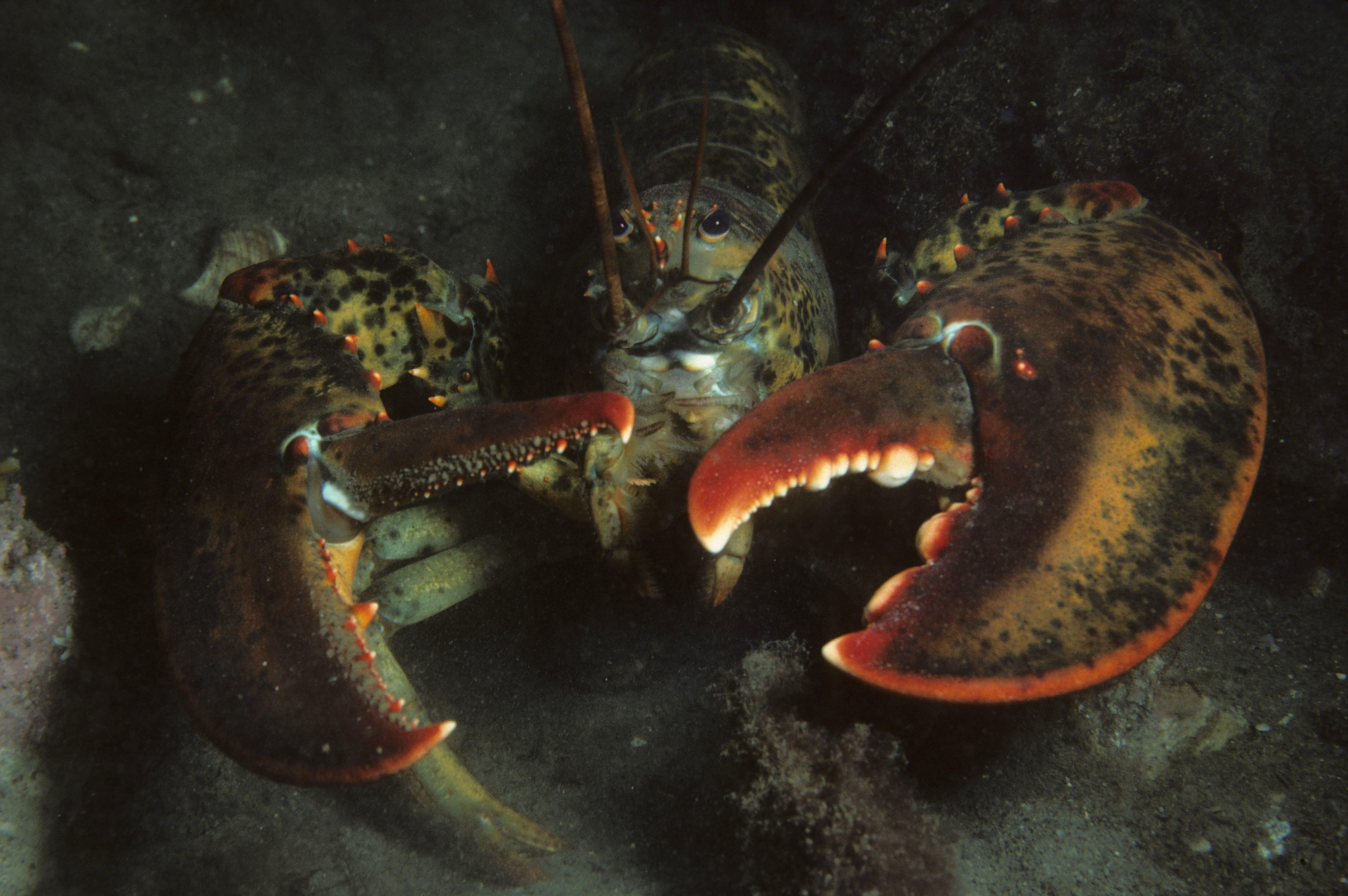
American lobster (Homarus americanus)

Dominance among crustaceans is also mediated through chemical cues. When crustaceans fight to determine dominance they urinate into the water. Later, if they meet again, both individuals can recognize each other by pheromones contained in their urine, allowing them to avoid a fight, if dominance has already been established. When a lobster encounters the urine of another individual, it will act differently according to the perceived status of the urinator (e.g. more submissively when exposed to the urine of a more dominant crab, or more boldly when exposed to the urine of a subdominant individual). When individuals are unable to communicate through urine, fights may be longer and more unpredictable.

== Applications of chemical ecology ==
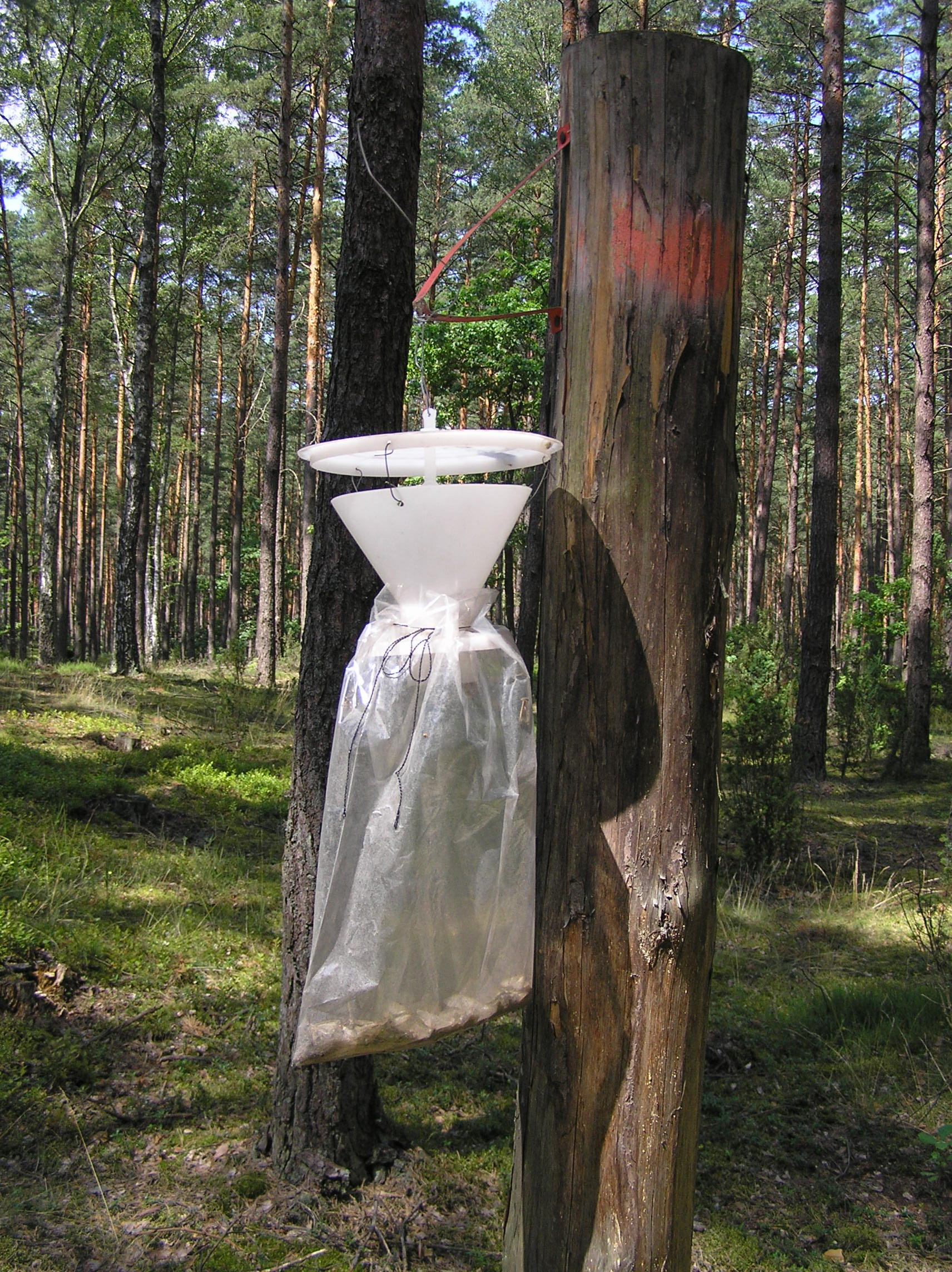
Pheromone trap used to catch the pest Lymantria monacha.

=== Pest control ===
Chemical ecology has been utilized in the development of sustainable pest control strategies. Semiochemicals (especially insect sex pheromones) are widely used in integrated pest management for surveillance, trapping and mating disruption of pest insects. Unlike conventional insecticides, pheromone-based methods of pest control are generally species-specific, non-toxic and extremely potent. In forestry, mass trapping has been used successfully to reduce tree mortality from bark beetle infestations in spruce and pine forests and from palm weevils in palm plantations. In Australia, pheromone base trapping use was implemented to off set the use of pesticides due to the residues left behind in sheep wool. In an aquatic system, a sex pheromone from the invasive sea lamprey has been registered by the United States Environmental Protection Agency for deployment in traps. A strategy has been developed in Kenya to protect cattle from trypanosomiasis spread by Tsetse fly by applying a mixture of repellent odors derived from a non-host animal, the waterbuck. The use of sex pheromones depends on various factors such as concentration, ability to sense the pheromone, temperature, mixture of the pheromone with other compounds, and medium in which the pheromone is delivered, e.g. aquatic vs terrestrial.

The successful push-pull agricultural pest management system makes use of chemical cues from intercropped plants to sustainably increase agricultural yields. The efficacy of push-pull agriculture relies on multiple forms of chemical communication. Though the push-pull technique was invented as a strategy to control stem-boring moths, such as Chilo partellus, through the manipulation of volatile host-finding cues, it was later discovered that allelopathic substances exuded by the roots of Desmodium spp. also contribute to the suppression of the damaging parasitic weed, Striga.

=== Drug development and biochemistry discoveries ===
Chemical structure of paclitaxel, trade name Taxol®.

A large proportion of commercial drugs (e.g. aspirin, ivermectin, cyclosporin, taxol) are derived from natural products that evolved due to their involvement in ecological interactions. While it has been proposed that the study of natural history could contribute to the discovery of new drug leads, most drugs derived from natural products were not discovered due to prior knowledge of their ecological functions. However, many fundamental biological discoveries have been facilitated by the study of plant toxins. For example, the characterization of the nicotinic acetylcholine receptor, the first neurotransmitter receptor to be identified, ensued from investigations into the mechanisms of action of curare and nicotine. Similarly, the muscarinic acetylcholine receptor takes its name from the fungal toxin muscarine. Whereas aquatic fungi provide specialized metabolites of interest for antibiotics, e.g. pestalone. Pestalone inhibits the growth of marine bacteria, the pathway to produce pestalone by marine fungi was found not to work when the bacteria is absent. The compound pestalone was derived from a marine fungus located in the Bahamas Islands on the surface of a brown alga, Rosenvingea sp. Development in biotechnology focuses on aquatic fungi in the pursuit of new antibiotics was inspired by terrestrial fungi, the cross over is not equivalent as demands in aquatic fungi are not exact to their terrestrial counter parts. Some aquatic fungi have shown changes to sphingolipid production under stressors such as acid resulting in the inhibition of biofilm formation. Whereas, wild type fungi are known to upregulate production of azole resistance drugs such as multidrug resistance protein 1 (MDR1) and transporters Cdr1 and Cdr2 that act like pumps to remove the antifungal drugs. Sphingolipid and sterols are the majority of the lipid bilayer membrane in fungi, e.g Candida species, and assist in formation of biofilms. Understanding the mechanism is utilized for development of vaccine adjuvants. Biofilm production is initiated through quorum sensing. Example of quorum sensing are the LuxR and LuxI proteins that attribute to the bioluminescence in Vibrio fischeri, LuxI produces acyl homoserine lactones (AHL) that are received by LuxR of neighboring bacteria, a specific concentration of AHL triggers gene expression of bioluminescence. Some vaccine adjuvants focus on biofilm formation by aiming to disrupt the communication utilizing current knowledge on quorum sensing.

== History of chemical ecology ==
=== After 1950 ===
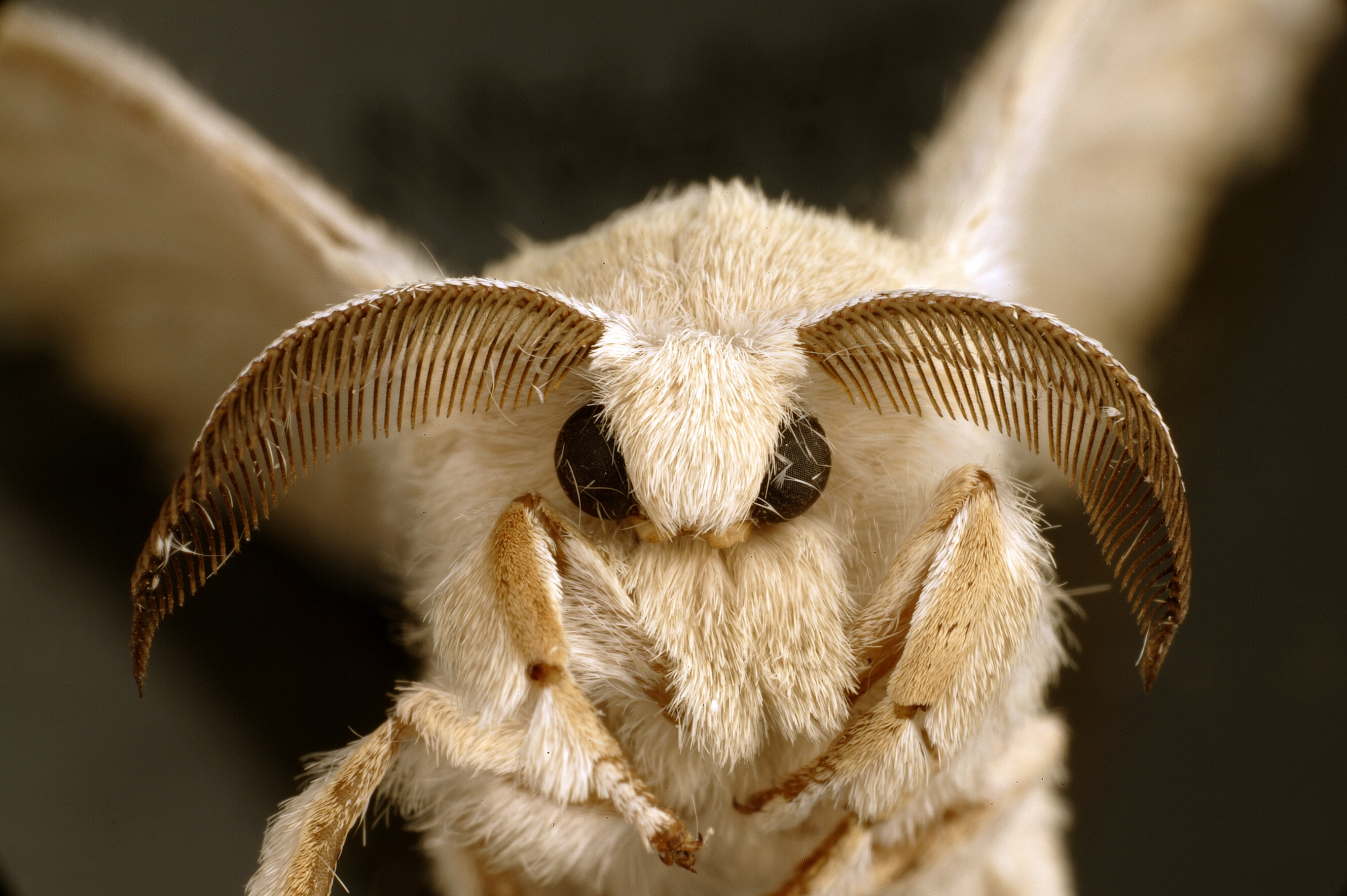
Silk moth (Bombyx mori)

In 1959, Adolf Butenandt identified the first intraspecific chemical signal (bombykol) from the silk moth, Bombyx mori, with material obtained by grinding up 500,000 moths. The same year, Karlson and Lüscher proposed the term 'pheromone' to describe this type of signal. Also in 1959, Gottfried S. Fraenkel also published his landmark paper, "The Raison d'être of Secondary Plant Substances", arguing that plant secondary are not metabolic waste products, but actually evolved to protect plants from consumers. Together, these papers marked the beginning of modern chemical ecology. In 1964, Paul R. Ehrlich and Peter H. Raven coauthored a paper proposing their influential theory of escape and radiate coevolution, which suggested that an evolutionary "arms-race" between plants and insects can explain the extreme diversification of plants and insects. The idea that plant metabolites could not only contribute to the survival of individual plants, but could also influence broad macroevolutionary patterns, would turn out to be highly influential. However, Tibor Jermy questioned the view of an evolutionary arms race between plants and their insect herbivores and proposed that the evolution of phytophagous insects followed and follows that of plants without major evolutionary feedback, i.e. without affecting plant evolution. He coined the term sequential evolution to describe plant-insect macroevolutionary patterns, which emphasizes that selection pressure exerted by insect attack on plants is weak or lacking.

In the 1960s and 1970s, a number of plant biologists, ecologists, and entomologists expanded this line of research on the ecological roles of plant secondary. During this period, Thomas Eisner and his close collaborator Jerrold Meinwald published a series seminal papers on chemical defenses in plants and insects. A number of other scientists at Cornell were also working on topics related to chemical ecology during this period, including Paul Feeny, Wendell L. Roelofs, Robert Whittaker and Richard B. Root. In 1968, the first course in chemical ecology was initiated at Cornell. In 1970, Eisner, Whittaker and the ant biologist William L. Brown, Jr. coined the terms allomone (to describe semiochemicals that benefit the emitter, but not the receiver) and kairomone (to describe semiochemicals that benefit the receiver only). Whittaker and Feeny published an influential review paper in Science the following year, summarizing the recent research on the ecological roles of chemical defenses in a wide variety of plants and animals and likely introducing Whittaker's new taxonomy of semiochemicals to a broader scientific audience. Around this time, Lincoln Brower also published a series of important ecological studies on monarch sequestration of cardenolides. Brower has been credited with popularizing the term "ecological chemistry" which appeared in the title of a paper he published in Science in 1968 and again the following year in an article he wrote for Scientific American, where the term also appeared on the front cover under an image of a giant bluejay towering over two monarch butterflies.

The specialized Journal of Chemical Ecology was established in 1975, and the Journal Chemoecology was founded in 1990. In 1984, the International Society of Chemical Ecology was established and in 1996, the Max Planck Institute of Chemical Ecology was founded in Jena, Germany.

== See also ==
- Chemical defense
- Semiochemical
- Chemical ecologists
- May R. Berenbaum
- Lincoln Brower
- Thomas Eisner
- Jerrold Meinwald
- Wendell L. Roelofs
- Escape and radiate coevolution
