= Lincoln Brower =

American entomologist (1931–2018)

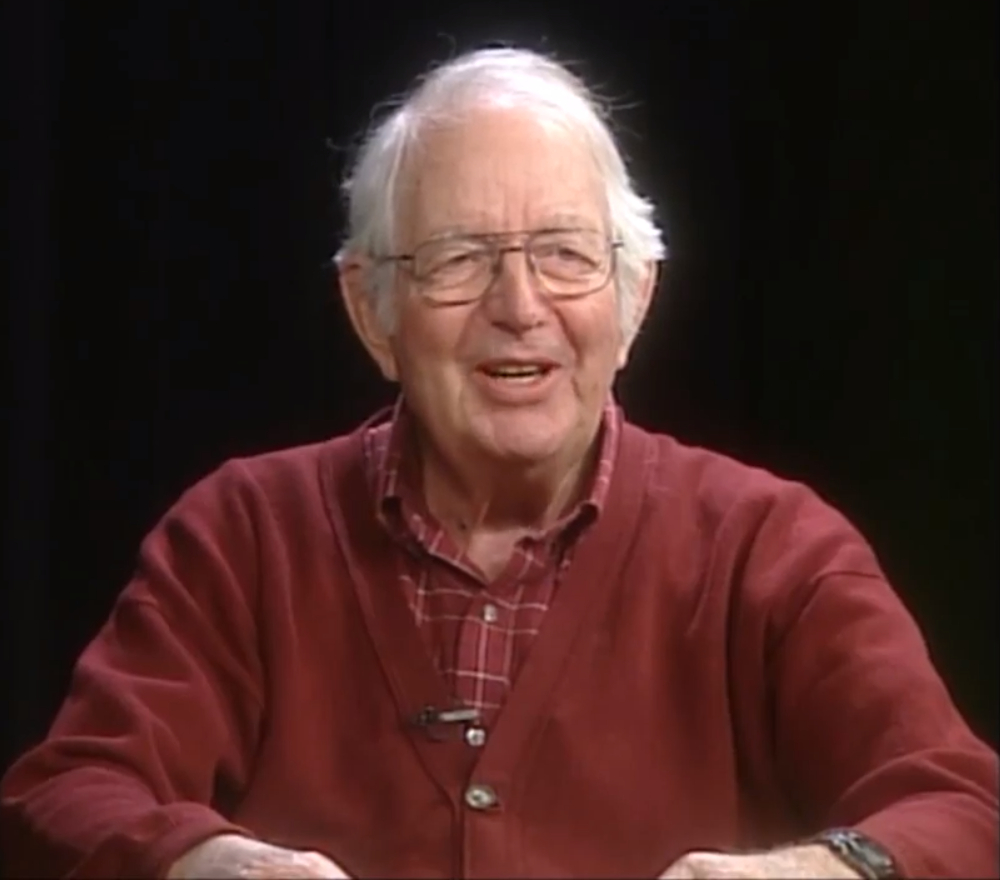
- Born: 10 September 1931; Madison, New Jersey
- Died: 17 July 2018 (aged 86); Roseland, Virginia
- Education: Princeton University BA in Biology; Yale University Ph.D.
- Known for: Work on monarch butterfly
- Scientific career
- Fields: Entomology; Ecology
- Workplaces: Amherst College; University of Florida; Sweet Briar College

Lincoln Pierson Brower (September 10, 1931 – July 17, 2018) was an American entomologist and ecologist, known for his work on monarch butterflies, chemical ecology and conservation.

== Life ==
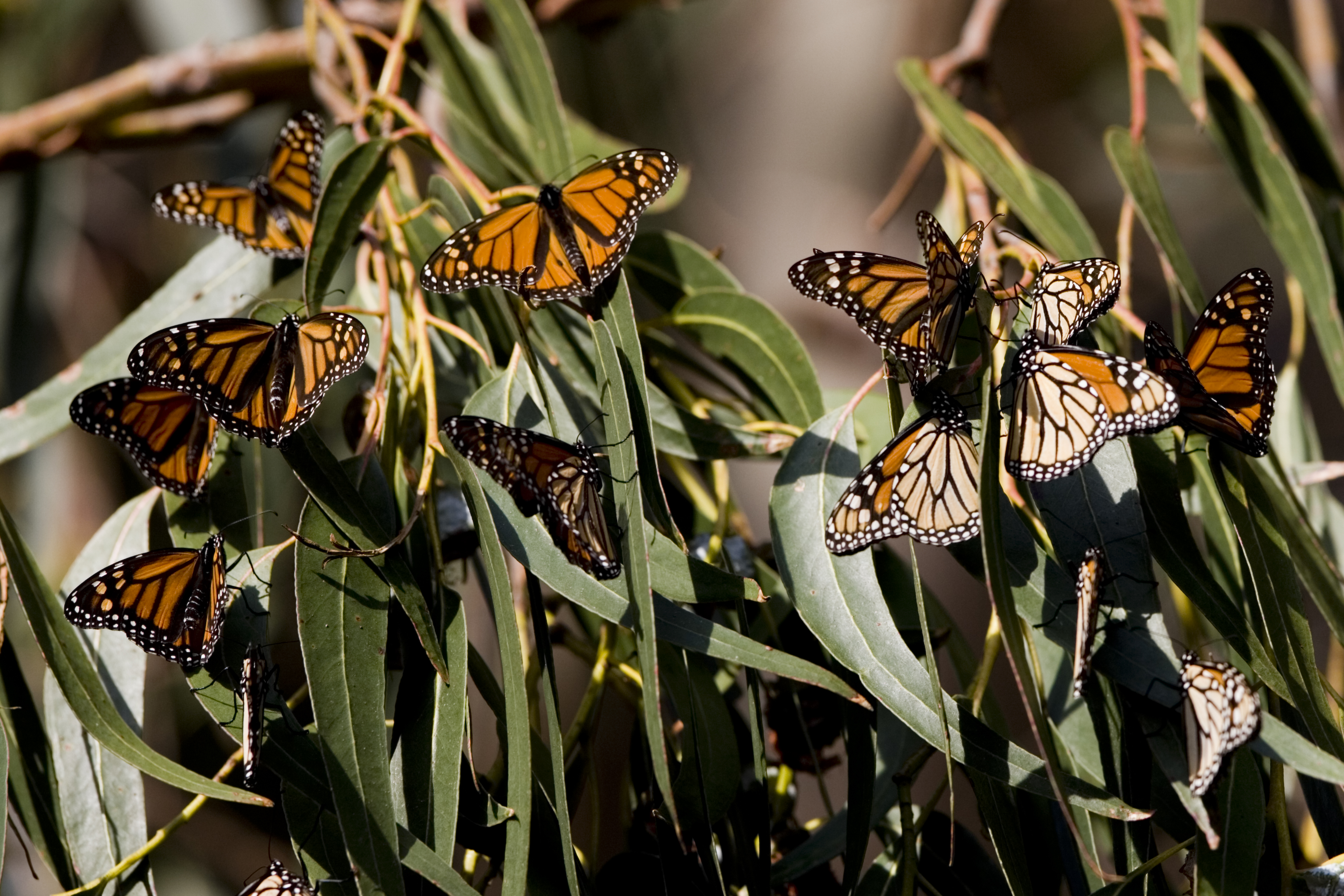
Monarch butterflies

Brower was born to Bailey and Helen Pierson Brower in Madison, New Jersey, in 1931. He was raised in Chatham Township, New Jersey, where he showed interest in butterflies. In an oral history, he recalled being punished at school, being made to sit all day for skipping a class to go out and collect a species of moth; asked whether it was worth it, he stated "Absolutely".

He met Jane Van Zandt while a student at Chatham High School. He was educated at Princeton University where he gained a BA in biology in 1953. He and Jane married and earned their PhDs in zoology together at Yale University in 1957, his on speciation in the Papilio glaucus group of butterflies, hers doing the first ever controlled experiments on Batesian mimicry in butterflies. They spent two years at Oxford University, the first as Fulbright scholars, in E. B. Ford's ecological genetics laboratory. He then lectured at Amherst College from 1958, rising to the endowed Stone Professorship in 1976. In 1980 he moved to the zoology department at the University of Florida. On retiring in 1997, he moved to Sweet Briar College as a research professor.

A butterfly and moth collector from an early age, he began studying the biology of the monarch butterfly while a postgraduate at Yale in 1954, and became a world expert on the species over six decades. He contributed to over 200 papers and 8 films, combining research, public education and conservation work. Unlike some popular sources, Brower did not suppose the monarch to be in danger of extinction, though he agreed that its migration across America was threatened.

He led a team of researchers studying the ecology of the overwintering grounds of the monarch in the mountains of Michoacan, Mexico, starting in the winter of 1977, incorporating aspects of thermal biology, predator-prey interactions, and chemical ecology. In the 1980s, he assisted conservation groups in Mexico and the Mexican government to protect fir forests used by the species from logging. In the last decades of his life, he recorded the sharp decline in the monarch population of North America, down by some 80% in the 20 years to 2018, attributed to herbicides, logging, and weather events. He was the only scientist to sign a 2014 petition to the US government to give the monarch legal protection.

He advised the novelist Barbara Kingsolver on butterfly migration for her 2012 book Flight Behavior.

== Family ==
He divorced Jane Van Zandt in 1974. He then married Christine Marie Moffitt; they divorced in 1980. He married his third wife, Linda S. Fink, in 1990. He had a son, Andrew Van Zandt Brower, who is also a biologist, and a daughter, Tamsin Brower Barrett.

He died on July 17, 2018, in Nelson County, Virginia.

== Honors and awards ==
- Honorary Life Member of the Lepidopterists' Society, 1990
- The Linnean Medal for zoology, the Linnean Society of London, 1993
- Distinguished Animal Behaviorist award, the Animal Behavior Society, 1995
- Wilbur Lucius Cross Medal, Yale University, 2005
- Marsh Award for Insect Conservation, the Royal Entomological Society, 2007
- Conservation Action Prize, Whitney R. Harris World Ecology Center, 2014
- The E. O. Wilson Award of the Center for Biological Diversity, 2016
- Fellow of the Entomological Society of America, 2017
- Research associate of the Smithsonian Institution
- Research associate of the McGuire Center for Lepidoptera at the University of Florida
- Henry Bates Award of the Association for Tropical Lepidoptera
- Fellow of the Royal Entomological Society
- Fellow of the Explorers Club
- Reconocimiento a la Conservacion de la Naturaleza from the Mexican federal government
