= Escape and radiate coevolution =

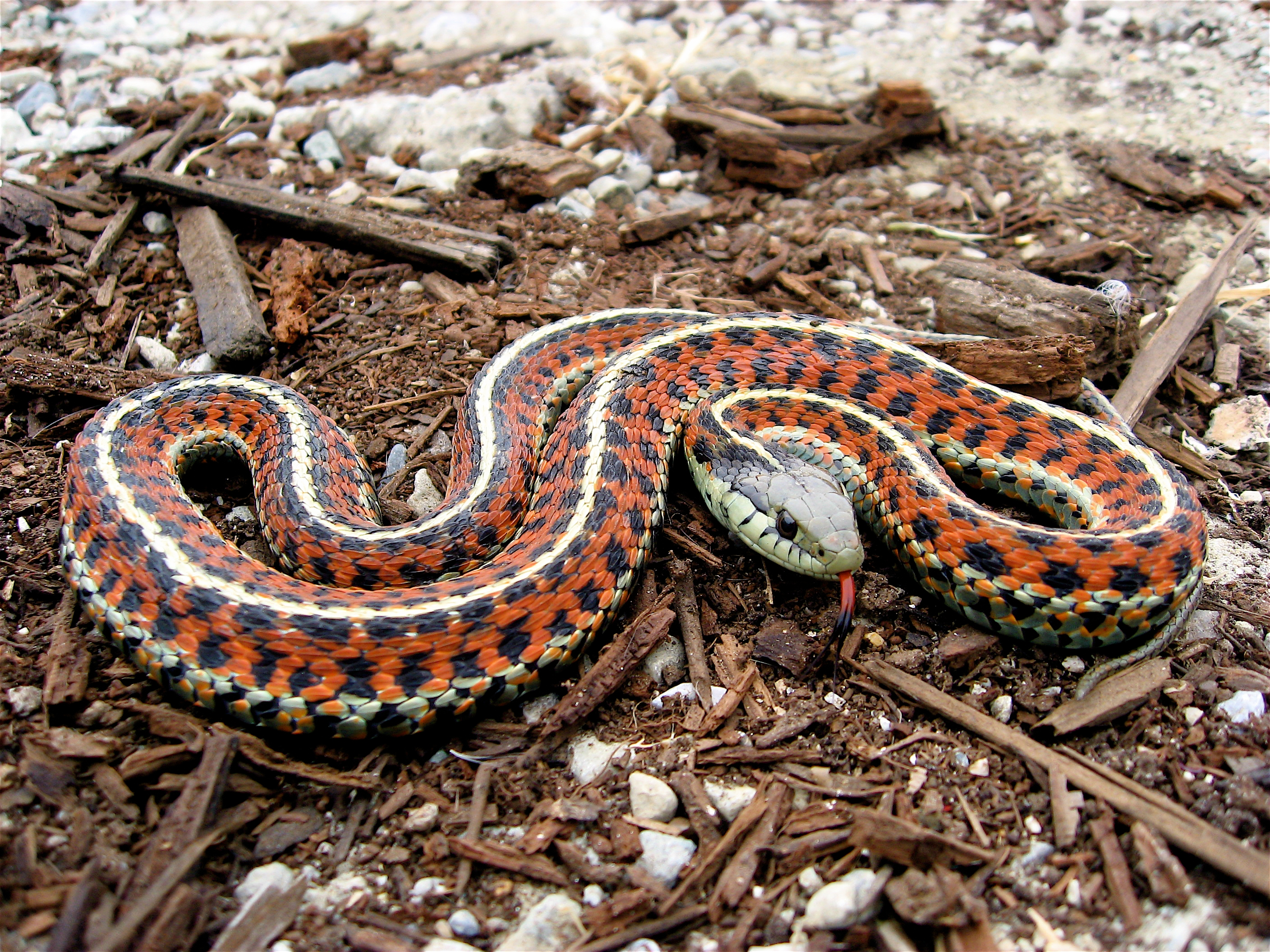
Garter snake is an example of escape and radiate coevolution.

Escape and radiate coevolution is a hypothesis proposing that a coevolutionary 'arms-race' between primary producers and their consumers contributes to the diversification of species by accelerating speciation rates. The hypothesized process involves the evolution of novel defenses in the host, allowing it to "escape" and then "radiate" into differing species.

== History ==
This hypothesis originated in a 1964 paper by Paul Ehrlich and Peter Raven, "Butterflies and plants: a study in coevolution". While this paper outlined the concept, the actual term "escape and radiate" was not actually coined until 1989 by John N. Thompson. The theory has been highly influential in chemical ecology and plant evolutionary ecology, but remains controversial due to the difficulty of collecting decisive evidence as well as uncertainty about the mechanisms linking ecological 'escape' with evolutionary diversification.

== Theory ==
=== Escape ===
A variety of defense mechanisms can lead to ecological escape from predators. Plants use chemical defenses in the form of secondary metabolites or allelochemicals. These allelochemicals inhibit the growth, behavior, and health of herbivores, allowing plants to escape. An example of a plant allelochemical are alkaloids that can inhibit protein synthesis in herbivores. Other forms of plant defense include mechanical defenses such as thigmonasty movements which have the plant leaves close in response to tactile stimulation. Indirect mechanisms plant include shedding of plant leaves so less leaves are available which deters herbivores, growth in locations in that are difficult to reach, and even mimicry. For organisms other than plants, examples of defense mechanisms allowing for escape include camouflage, aposematism, heightened senses and physical capabilities, and even defensive behaviors such as feigning death. An example of an organism using one of these defense mechanisms is the granular poison frog which defends itself through aposematism. It is important to understand that in order for escape and radiate coevolution to occur, it is necessary that the developed defense is novel rather than previously established.

Induced defense stemming from adaptive phenotypic plasticity may help a plant defend itself against multiple enemies. Phenotypic plasticity occurs when an organism undergoes an environmental change forcing a change altering its behavior, physiology, etc. These induced defenses allow for an organism to escape.

=== Radiation ===
Radiation is the evolutionary process of diversification of a single species into multiple forms. It includes the physiological and ecological diversity within a rapidly multiplying lineage. There are many types of radiation including adaptive, concordant, and discordant radiation however escape and radiate coevolution does not always follow those specific types.

Ehrlich and Raven's original paper did not clearly answer why ecological escape leads to increased diversification, however several explanations have been proposed. Once a novel defense has been acquired, the attacking organism which had evolved adaptations that allowed it to predate is now up against a new defense that it has not yet been evolved to encounter. This gives the defending organism the advantage, and therefore time to rapidly multiply unopposed by the previously attacking organism. This ultimately leads to the physiological and ecological diversity within the rapidly multiplying lineage, hence radiation.

== Importance ==
Ehrlich and Raven's paper was highly influential on a generation of biologists and contributed to the explosion of research on plant-insect interactions and chemical ecology. The theory of escape and radiate coevolution purports to explain why we see such vast biological diversity on earth. After the organism escapes, it then radiates into multiple species, and spreads geographically. Evidence of escape and radiate coevolution can be seen through the starburst effect in plant and herbivore clades. When analyzing clades of predator-prey associations, although it varies, the starburst effect is a good indicator that escape and radiate coevolution may be occurring. Eventually this cycle must come to an end because adaptations that entail costs (such as allocation of resources, or vulnerability to other predators) at some point outweigh their benefits.

Escape and radiate coevolution may support parallel cladogenesis, wherein plant and herbivore phylogenies might match with ancestral insects exploiting ancestral plants. This is significant because it allows researchers to hypothesize about the relationships between ancestral organisms. Unfortunately, there have not yet been any known examples specifically involving escape and radiate coevolution being used for hypothesizing ancestral relationships.

Many times the organism that has "escaped" continuously undergoes selective pressure because the predator it has escaped from evolves to create another adaptation in response, causing the process to continue. These "offensive" traits developed by predators range widely. For example, herbivores can develop an adaptation that allows for improved detoxification which allow to overcome plant defenses, thus causing escape and radiate coevolution to continue. Often the term "evolutionary arms race" is used to illustrate the idea that continuous evolution is needed to maintain the same relative fitness while the two species are coevolving. This idea also ties in with the Red Queen hypothesis. Counter adaptations among two organisms through escape and radiate coevolution is a major driving force behind diversity.

Escape and radiate coevolution produces much more biological variation than other evolutionary mechanisms. For instance, cospeciation is important for diversity amongst species that share a symbiotic relationship, however this does not create nearly as much diversity in comparison to reciprocal evolutionary change due to natural selection. Evidence of rapid diversification following a novel adaptation is shown through the evolution of resin and latex canal tubes in 16 different lineages of plants. Plants with resin or latex canals can easily defend themselves against insect herbivores. When lineages of canal bearing plants are compared to the lineages of canal free plants, it is apparent that canal bearing plants are far more diverse, supporting escape and radiate coevolution.

== Examples ==
=== Plant-herbivore ===
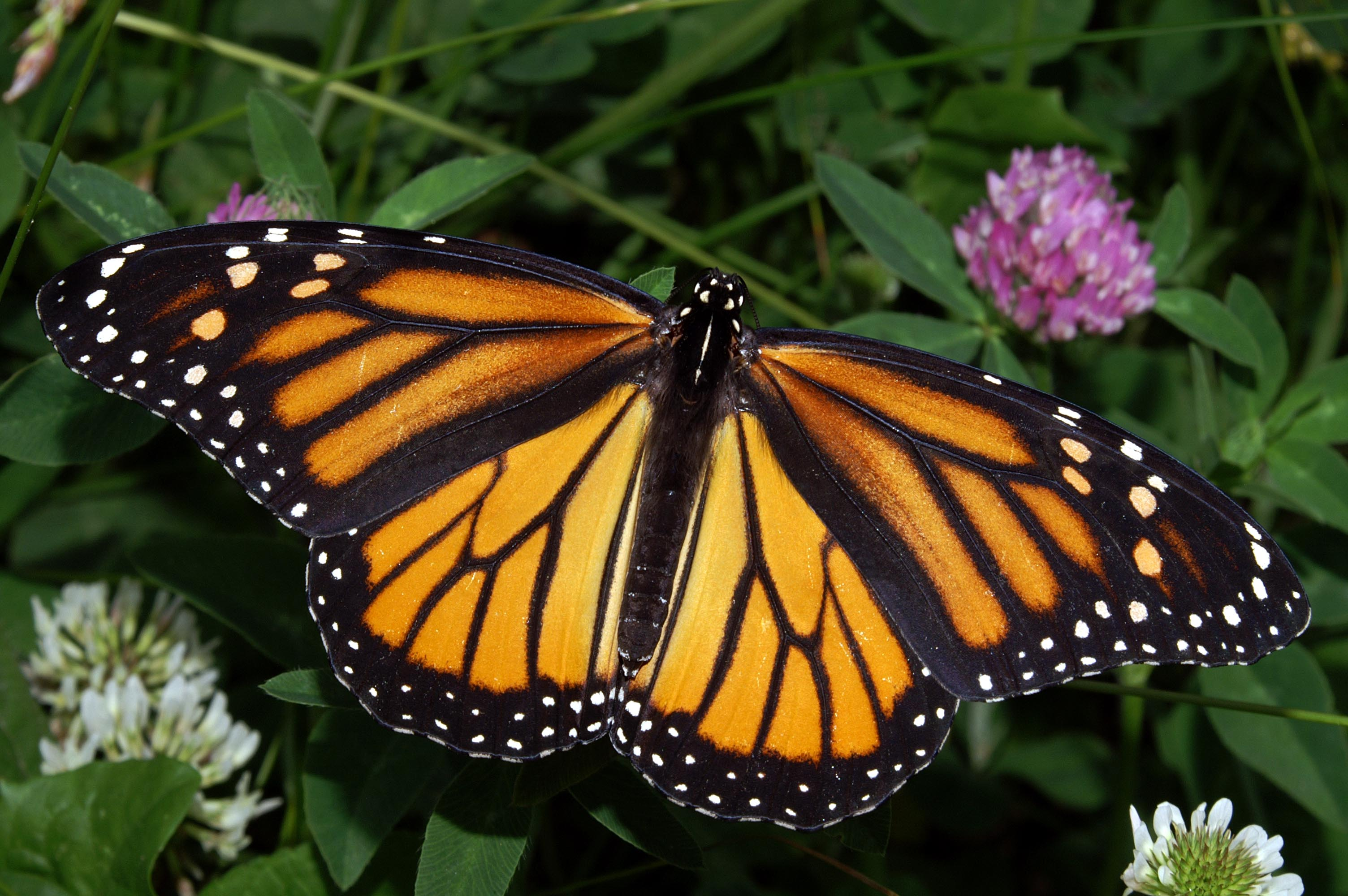
Erlich and Raven's Classic butterfly model

The most popular examples of escape and radiate coevolution are of plant-herbivore associations. The most classic example is of butterflies and plants outlined in Ehrlich and Raven's original paper, "Butterflies and plants: a study in coevolution.". Erlich and Raven found in 1964 that hostplants for butterflies had a wide range of chemical defenses, allowing them to escape herbivory. Butterflies who developed novel counter detoxification mechanisms against the hostplants chemical defenses were able to utilize the hostplant resources. The process of stepwise adaptation and counteradaptation among the butterflies and hostplants is continuous and creates vast diversity.

Tropical trees may also escape and defend themselves. Trees growing in high light were predicted to have few chemical defenses, but rapid synchronous leaf expansion and low leaf nutritional quality during expansion. Species growing in low light have high levels of different chemical defenses, poor nutritional quality and asynchronous leaf expansion. Depending on the level of light the trees were growing in influenced the type of defenses they obtained, either chemical or through leaf expansion. The trees exposed to less light developed various chemicals to defend themselves against herbivores, a defense not utilizing light. This study was significant because it illustrates the separation between defenses and their relationship with an organism escaping and radiating into other species. Development of novel defenses does not necessarily imply that escape is possible for a species of plant if herbivores are adapting at a faster rate.

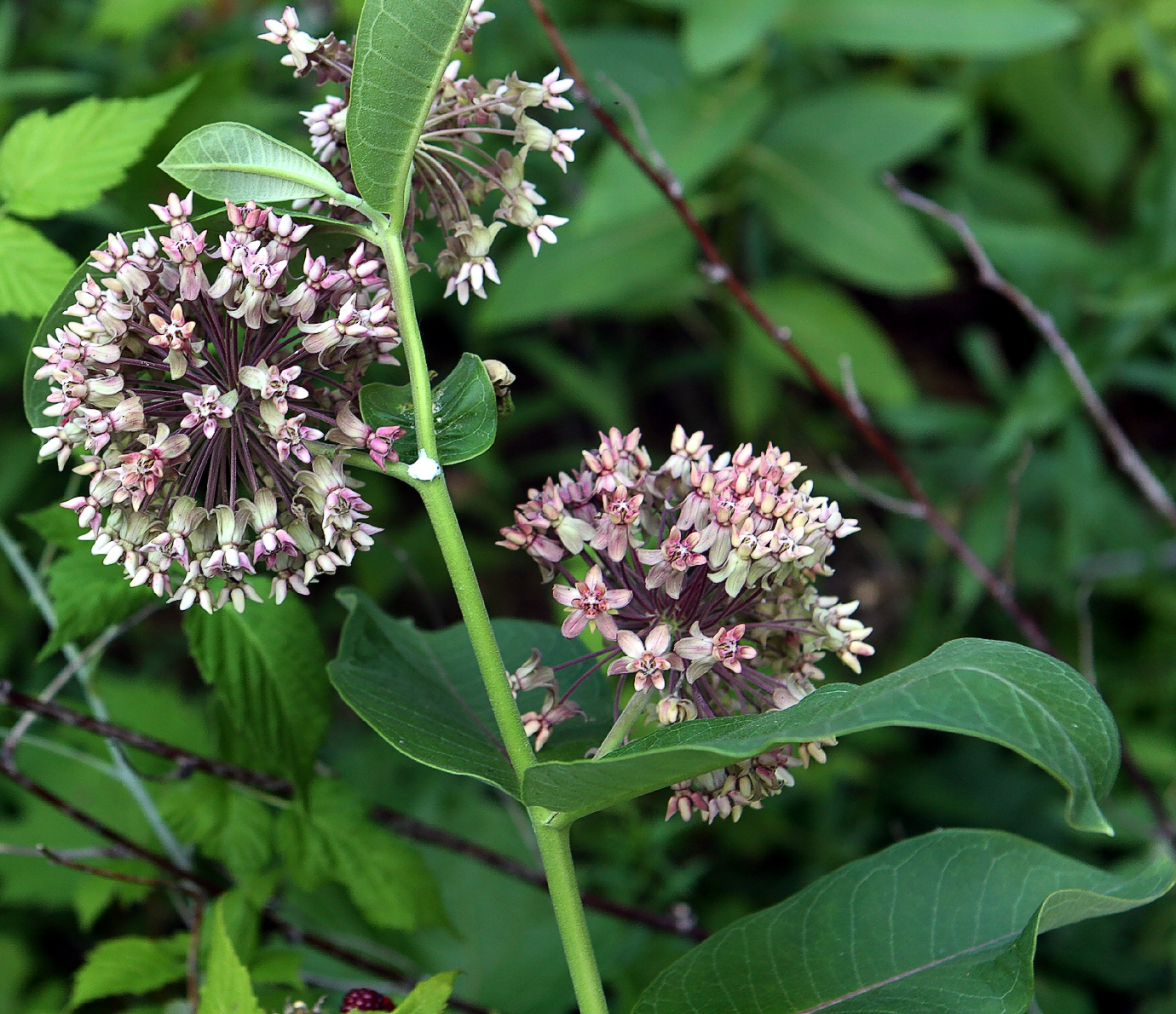
Common milkweed plant bears latex tubes to ward off herbivores.

Milkweed plants contain latex-filled canals which deter insect herbivores. Milkweed latex not only gums up the mouth-parts of insects but is also toxic because it contains cardenolides which disrupt sodium and potassium levels by inhibiting the essential enzyme, Na^{+}/K^{+}‐ATPase. This has allowed for milkweeds to "escape" and become extremely diverse. There are over 100 different species of milkweeds which shows how diverse the plant is, with escape and radiate coevolution playing a very large role in creating such a high number of species.

=== Fish-water flea ===
Key adaptations are adaptations that allow a group of organisms to diversify. Daphnia lumholtzi is a water flea that is able to form rigid head spines in response to chemicals released when fish are present. These phenotypically plastic traits serve as an induced defense against these predators. A study showed that Daphnia pulicaria is competitively superior to D. lumholtzi in the absence of predators. However, in the presence of fish predation the invasive species formed its defenses and became the dominant water flea in the region. This switch in dominance suggests that the induced defense against fish predation could represent a key adaptation for the invasion success of D. lumholtzi. A defensive trait that qualifies as a key adaptation is most likely an example of escape and radiate coevolution.

=== Bacteria-phage ===
The theory can be applied at the microscopic level such as to bacteria-phage relationships. Bacteria were able to diversify and escape through resistance to phages. The diversity among the hosts and parasites differed among the range of infection and resistance. The implication of this study to humans is its important to understanding the evolution of infectious organisms, and preventing diseases.
