= Jerrold Meinwald =

American chemist and pharmacologist (1927–2018)

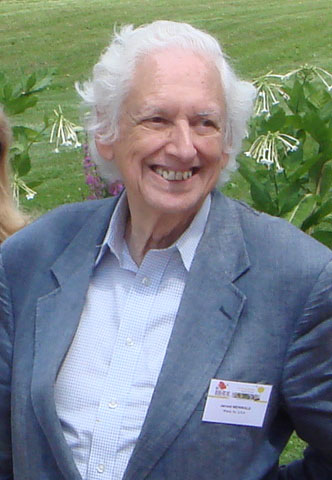
- Meinwald in 2010
- Born: January 16, 1927; New York City, U.S.
- Died: April 23, 2018 (aged 91); Ithaca, New York, U.S.
- Education: Harvard University; University of Chicago
- Awards: Benjamin Franklin Medal in Chemistry (2013) Nakanishi Prize (2013); National Medal of Science (2012); Roger Adams Award (2005); Tyler Prize for Environmental Achievement (1990) Ernest Guenther Award (1984)
- Scientific career
- Fields: Chemistry
- Workplaces: Cornell University
- Doctoral students: George Wiley

Jerrold Meinwald (January 16, 1927 – April 23, 2018) was an American chemist known for his work on chemical ecology, a field he co-founded with his colleague and friend Thomas Eisner. He was a Goldwin Smith Professor Emeritus of Chemistry at Cornell University. He was author or co-author of well over 400 scientific articles. His interest in chemistry was sparked by fireworks done with his friend Michael P. Cava when they were still in junior high school. Meinwald was also a music aficionado and studied flute with Marcel Moyse – the world's greatest flutist of his time.

== Career ==
Jerrold Meinwald was born in 1927 in New York City. He studied chemistry at the University of Chicago where he earned his Bachelor of Science degree in 1948. He then went on to Harvard University where he obtained his Ph.D. with R.B. Woodward in 1952. A DuPont Fellowship brought him to Cornell, where he has spent most of his subsequent career.

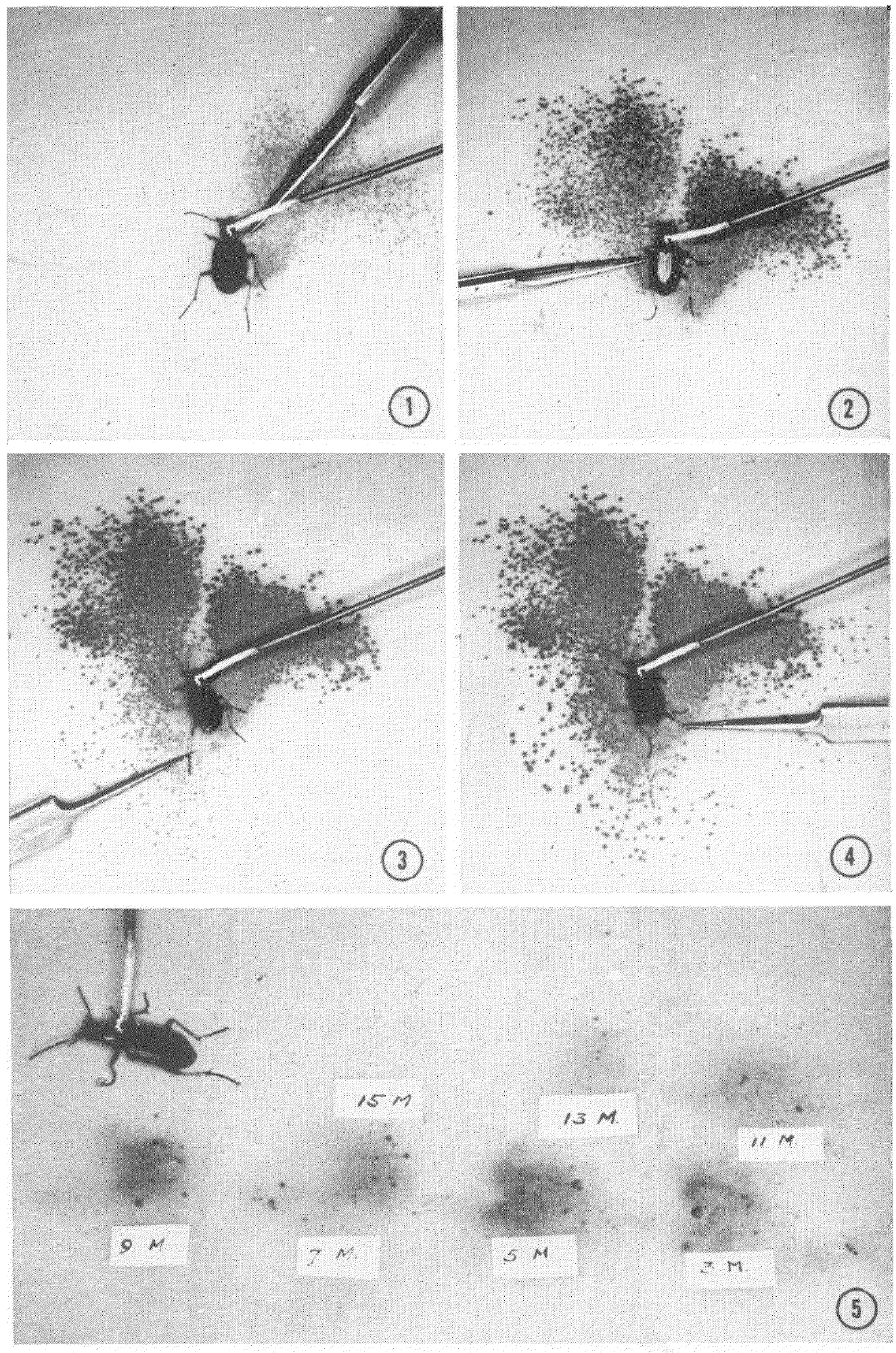
Series from a study by Meinwald and Eisner investigating defensive spray in Chlaenius beetles with paper that turns dark in response to chemicals.

Since the early 1960s, he has worked, often in collaboration with Thomas Eisner, on chemical signalling in animals, particularly insects and arthropods; he is regarded as one of the founders of the field of chemical ecology. A particular field of interest was the ways in which insects either use chemicals synthesised by the plants that they feed on, or use those plant chemicals as substrates from which to synthesize their own. A species on which he and Eisner published several times over decades is the moth Utetheisa ornatrix, which collects pyrrolizidine alkaloids from its food source and uses them as a deterrent to predators; the male also uses them as a pheromone and passes them on in its semen to the female who uses them to make her eggs unpalatable.

In analysing the constituents of plant signalling, he developed a number of retrosynthetic techniques, including the Meinwald Rearrangement where an epoxide is converted to a carbonyl in the presence of a Lewis acid; he has also performed substantial research over forty years in NMR spectroscopy. and in reactions for producing chiral derivatives in order to determine absolute configurations of chiral molecules.

In 1981, Meinwald became a founding member of the World Cultural Council. He died in Ithaca on April 23, 2018, at the age of 91.

== Awards ==
He won the National Medal of Science in 2012. He was a member of the National Academy of Sciences since 1969, Fellow of the American Academy of Arts and Sciences since 1970, and member of the American Philosophical Society since 1987. Other notable honours:

- Distinguished Leadership Award, American Academy of Arts and Sciences (2016)
- Grand Prix de la Fondation de la Maison de la Chimie, Paris, France (2006)
- Nakanishi Prize, American Chemical Society (2014)
- Roger Adams Award in Organic Chemistry, American Chemical Society (2005)
- Chemical Pioneer Award, American Institute of Chemists (1997)
- Silver Medal of the International Society of Chemical Ecology (1991)
- Tyler Prize for Environmental Achievement (1990)
- A. C. Cope Scholar Award, American Chemical Society (1989)
- Fellow, American Academy of Arts and Sciences (1970)

== Publications ==
- Eisner, T, & Meinwald, J, Eds. (1995) Chemical Ecology: The Chemistry of Biotic Interaction. National Academy Press.
