= India Climate Collaborative =

Climate change initiative

India Climate Collaborative (ICC) is an initiative undertaken by philanthropists from India to understand the challenges posed by climate change and find solutions for climate crisis. Planning began in 2018, and the initiative was launched in January 2020.

== Context ==
The primary objective of the collective is to establish an India-only climate narrative and identify solutions for the harsh effects of climate change. It will be a platform for "diverse voices, innovative solutions, and collective investments." In 2018, India ranked 5th among 181 countries as a nation with the highest number of deaths triggered by climate change.

== Participants ==
Individual philanthropists include Ratan Tata, Rohini Nilekani, Nadir Godrej, Anand Mahindra, Aditi Premji, Rishad Premji, Vidya Shah, and Hemendra Kothari.

The Energy and Resources Institute (TERI), Centre for Science & Environment, Ashoka Trust for Research in Ecology & the Environment, Centre for Policy Research, Indian School of Business, World Resources Institute, Shakti Sustainable Energy Foundations, People's Archive for Rural India (PARI), Swades Foundation, Indian Development Review (IDR), SELCO, and Oxford University are some of the academic and research organisations associated with the collective.

Shloka Nath of Tata Trusts is the Executive Director.
