= Academic ranks in South Africa =

Academic ranks in South Africa are the titles, relative importance and power of professors, researchers, and administrative personnel held in academia.

== Overview ==
- Professor Emeritus
- Distinguished/Extraordinary Professor (must hold a PhD, except in accounting)
- Senior Professor (must hold a PhD, except in accounting) (not at all universities)
- Professor (must hold a PhD, except in accounting)
- Associate professor (must hold a PhD, except in accounting)
- Senior lecturer, Senior researcher (must hold a PhD, except in accounting and actuarial science, although sometimes appointed while still studying the PhD)
- Lecturer, Researcher (must hold a Master's degree, except in accounting and actuarial science)
- Junior lecturer, Researcher (must hold an Honours degree, except in accounting and actuarial science)
- Research assistant
- Tutor, student-assistant, demonstrator
- Administrative assistant
- Senior secretary

Administrative ranks

- Chancellor (titular), (honorific)
- Vice chancellor
- Rector/principal & vice-chancellor (dual title)
- Vice-rector/vice-principal and deputy vice-chancellor/pro-vice-chancellor
- Dean
- Vice-dean/deputy dean
- Programme directors/Programme Convenor
- Departmental chairperson or head of department

In Afrikaans-speaking universities the terms rector and vice-rector are common, whereas English-speaking universities tend to favour the terms principal and vice-principal. The use of deputy vice-chancellor seems to be phasing out pro-vice-chancellor.

== Professorship ==
The appointment of professors follows the British system, and the term "professor" is never used for school teachers. However, since the university system has long been fractured between research-intensive and undergraduate teaching-focused universities, there is no absolute consistency. The description provided here refers to research-intensive universities, which are generally recognized as the top tier of the university system, and which are responsible for almost all university-based research and postgraduate (Honours, Masters and Doctoral) graduations. The academic ranking system is roughly as follows:

- Associate (or assistant) lecturer (normally: contract staff)
- Lecturer (full-time staff)
- Senior Lecturer (distinguished by publications record, holding a Doctoral degree and/ or years of meritorious service)
- Associate professor
- (Full) Professor
- Professor emeritus (on retirement at the age of 65, and granted on application and at university discretion)

Professor positions are clearly separated from more junior faculty positions, but only (full) Professors sit on the University Senate by virtue of their positions in faculty. Other grades may be present, but only through other appointments, such as being Heads of Departments or programmes, or as elected representatives of other staff. Full "Professor" refers to the most senior academic grade, and is ideally based upon extensive publications, postgraduate supervision, academic leadership, service to the field, and recognition in the field. Professors are expected to have PhDs, but there is no equivalent to the German Habilitation system.

Several universities have created posts such as "Honorary Professor" (for appointments of lay experts) and Distinguished/Extraordinary Professor (for the most exemplary Professors). Several undergraduate teaching-focused universities award various Professorial ranks, but criteria for appointment can vary quite widely.
