= Thomas Eisner =

German-American entomologist and ecologist (1929–2011)

- Born: June 25, 1929; Berlin, Germany
- Died: March 25, 2011 (aged 81); Ithaca, New York, U.S.
- Citizenship: United States
- Education: Harvard University
- Known for: Pioneering chemical ecology
- Awards: Newcomb Cleveland Prize (1967); Tyler Prize for Environmental Achievement (1990); National Medal of Science (1994); John J. Carty Award (2008)
- Scientific career
- Fields: Insect chemical ecology
- Workplaces: Cornell University

Thomas Eisner (June 25, 1929 – March 25, 2011) was a German-American entomologist and ecologist, known as the "father of chemical ecology." He was a Jacob Gould Schurman Professor of Chemical Ecology at Cornell University, and director of the Cornell Institute for Research in Chemical Ecology (CIRCE). He was a world authority on animal behavior, ecology, and evolution, and, together with his Cornell colleague Jerrold Meinwald, was one of the pioneers of chemical ecology, the discipline dealing with the chemical interactions of organisms. He was author or co-author of some 400 scientific articles and seven books.

== Personal life ==
Thomas Eisner was born on June 25, 1929, in Berlin, Germany. His father, Hans Eisner, was a chemist of Jewish origin, and a coworker of Fritz Haber at the Kaiser Wilhelm Institute for Electrochemistry in Berlin; he later held a chair for chemistry at Cornell. His mother, Margarete Heil-Eisner, was an artist. Escaping the Nazi regime, the family moved to Barcelona and, following the Spanish Civil War, to Uruguay. The Eisners came to the U.S. in 1947.

Thomas Eisner became a naturalized American citizen, and applied to Cornell University as an undergraduate, but was rejected. He received his B.S. and PhD degrees from Harvard University, and joined Cornell's entomology faculty in 1957. He married Maria Eisner, who was a member of his lab. In 1964, he helped found the Department of Neurobiology and Behavior, where he worked until his death.

In addition to his academic work, he was a passionate nature photographer and videographer. His film Secret Weapons won the Grand Award at the New York Film Festival and was named Best Science Film by the British Association for the Advancement of Science. He was also an avid pianist and occasional conductor. Eisner died on March 25, 2011, of Parkinson's disease.

He was an atheist.

== Work ==
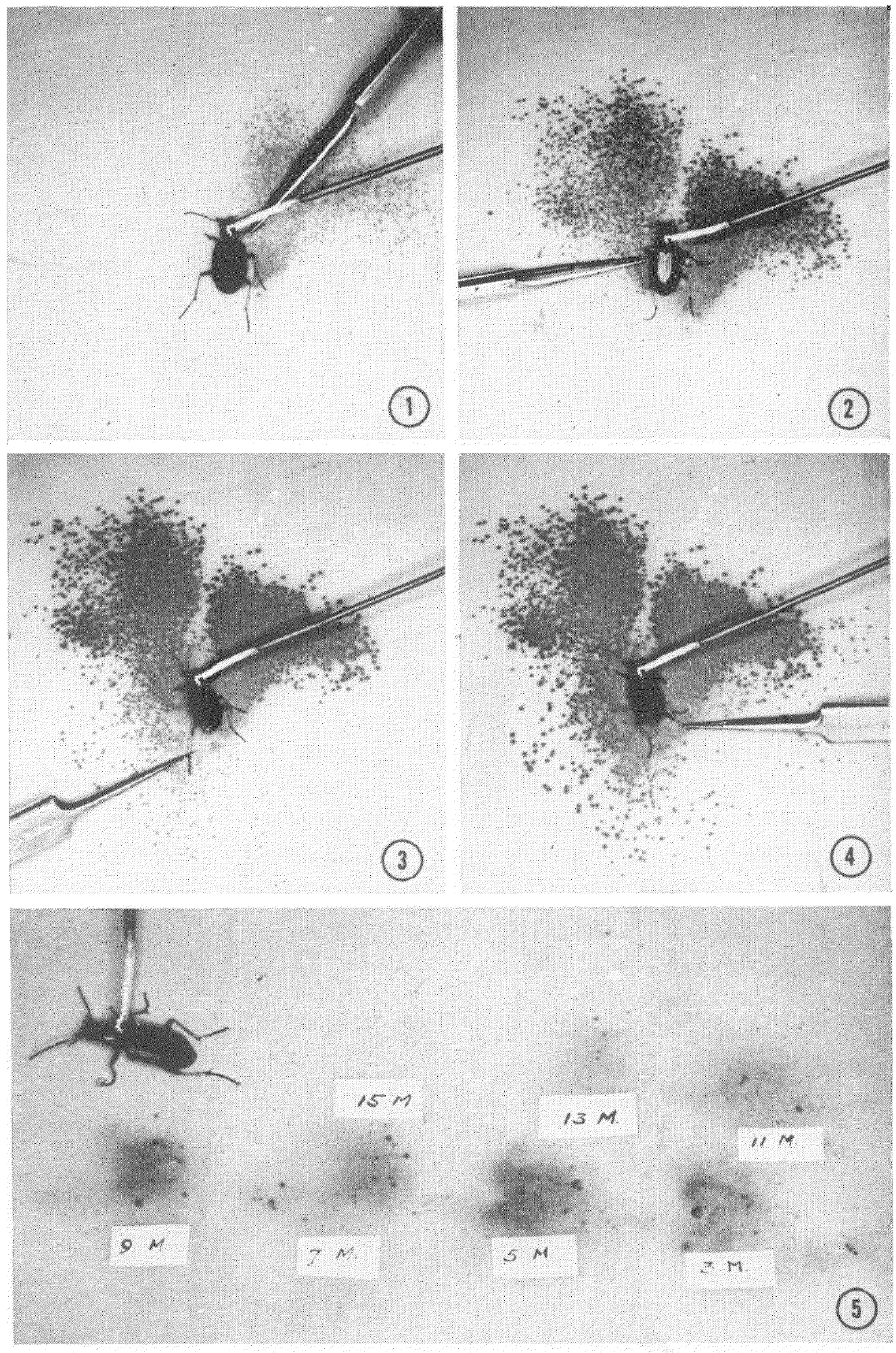
Series from a study by Eisner and colleagues investigating defensive spray in Chlaenius beetles with paper that turns dark in response to chemicals.

Eisner's main body of work was in chemical ecology, primarily studying the chemical defenses of insects against predation. Some of his most famous work was conducted on the bombardier beetle, which he discovered creates a chemical reaction within its body to shoot a boiling noxious liquid from a nozzle in its abdomen.

A field biologist with working experience on four continents, he was also an active conservationist. He served on the board of directors of the National Audubon Society, the National Scientific Council of the Nature Conservancy, and the World Resources Institute Council. He was a past president of the American Society of Naturalists, and chairman of the Biology Section of the American Association for the Advancement of Science. He played a key role in initiating the Congressional Fellow Program in Washington DC, and in efforts to preserve wilderness areas in Florida and Texas.

Eisner was furthermore a member of the National Academy of Sciences, the American Academy of Arts and Sciences, and the American Philosophical Society. He received numerous honors, including the Tyler Prize for Environmental Achievement, the Harvard Centennial Medal, the 1994 National Medal of Science and the Lewis Thomas Prize for Writing about Science. He also held honorary degrees from universities in Sweden, Germany, Switzerland and the United States, and was a foreign fellow of the Royal Society. Eisner was additionally a member of the Deutsche Akademie der Naturforscher Leopoldina and Academia Europaea.

In 2008, Eisner was awarded the John J. Carty Award by the National Academy of Sciences.

== Publications ==
- Eisner, T, (2003) For Love of Insects. Harvard University Press. ISBN 0-674-01181-3; Eisner, Thomas (2005). 2005 edition. Harvard University Press. ISBN 0-674-01827-3; pbk
- Eisner, T, Eisner, M, & Siegler, M, (2005) Secret Weapons: Defenses of Insects, Spiders, Scorpions, and Other Many-Legged Creatures. Harvard University Press.
- Eisner, T, Bert Hölldobler & Martin Lindauer: Chemische Ökologie, Territorialität, gegenseitige Verständigung. Fischer, Stuttgart/New York 1986, ISBN 3-437-30524-7.
