= Journal of Chemical Ecology =

- Discipline: Chemical ecology
- Language: English

Publication details
- History: 1975-present
- Publisher: Springer Science+Business Media
- Frequency: Monthly
- Impact factor: 2.239 (2013)

Standard abbreviations
- ISO 4: J. Chem. Ecol.

Indexing
- CODEN: JCECD8
- ISSN: 0098-0331 (print); 1573-1561 (web)
- LCCN: 75644091
- OCLC no.: 299333697

Links
- Journal homepage; Online archive

The Journal of Chemical Ecology is a monthly peer-reviewed scientific journal published by Springer Science+Business Media covering all aspects of chemical ecology. The journal was established in 1975 and is the official journal of the International Society of Chemical Ecologists and the Asia-Pacific Association of Chemical Ecologists. The editor-in-chief is Gary W. Felton (Pennsylvania State University). According to the Journal Citation Reports, the journal has a 2013 impact factor of 2.239.
