= Richard B. Root =

Richard Bruce Root
- Born: September 7, 1936; Dearborn, Michigan
- Died: January 22, 2013 (aged 76)
- Education: University of Michigan
- Known for: ecological guild concept
- Spouse(s): Elizabeth "Betsy" Eichstedt; Barbara Page
- Awards: Eugene P. Odum Award (2004)
- Scientific career
- Workplaces: Cornell University
- Thesis: Niche organization in the Blue-gray Gnatcatcher (Polioptila caerulea) (1964)
- Doctoral advisor: Frank Pitelka

Richard Bruce "Dick" Root (7 September 1936 – 22 January 2013) was a professor of evolutionary biology, ecology and entomology. He was an important contributor to the field of ecology, and is best known for introducing the concept of the ecological “guild”. This concept is found in his doctoral research paper focused on defining the ecological niche and comparing the niche dimensions of the blue-grey gnatcatcher with other insectivorous bird species.

== Research career ==
Root completed his undergraduate and honours degrees at the University of Michigan, before moving to University of California, Berkeley to complete his PhD research. Root's first scientific article was published in 1960, based on his honours research on flatworm demography. His doctoral thesis, titled “Niche organization in the Blue-gray Gnatcatcher (Polioptila caerulea)”, was completed in 1964 and later published in Ecological Monographs in 1967. The concept of ecological guilds established in this paper has become a highly influential in ecology. His research later shifted focus from insectivorous birds to focusing on the insects themselves (Cornell University memorials 2013). His research in later years concentrated mostly on trends in the traits, functions, and affinities of the arthropods associated with goldenrods (especially tall goldenrod, Solidago altissima).

By 2003, Root had supervised 33 Ph.D. students and 4 master's students, who sometimes described themselves as "Rootlets". In the final seven years of his life, Root experienced a gradual decline in his mental and physical abilities due to a degenerative disease, but continued to be involved in science, visiting Cornell University regularly, attending lunch meetings and visiting field sites. He died on January 22, 2013, and was survived by his wife Barbara, two children and two stepchildren through his marriage to Barbara.

== Awards and honours ==
In 1962, while a graduate student, Root won the A. Brazier Howell Award of the Cooper Ornithological Society. Throughout his career, he received many prestigious awards, including the Eminent Ecologist Award (2003) and Eugene P. Odum Award (2004), both presented by the Ecological Society of America. In 2003, he received the Edgerton Career Teaching Award from the College of Agriculture and Life Sciences at Cornell University. He was an inaugural Fellow of the Ecological Society of America.
