= Innovation Centre Denmark =

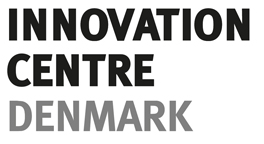
- Company type: Government agency
- Founded: 2006
- Headquarters: Copenhagen, Denmark
- Number of locations: 7 Locations
- Products: Connecting Danish innovation to global markets
- Website: www.icdk.um.dk

The Innovation Centre Denmark (ICDK) is a governmental agency that assists Danish businesses, startups and research institutions by giving them access to international knowledge and innovation environments.

It was established and is managed as a partnership between the Ministry of Foreign Affairs of Denmark and the Danish Ministry of Higher Education and Science.

Currently, the ICDK has locations in seven regions: Munich, Bangalore, Seoul, Shanghai, Silicon Valley, Tel Aviv and Boston.

== History ==
On June 4, 2006 Prince Joachim of Denmark opened the first Innovation Centre Denmark in Silicon Valley, California. The center was a pilot project tasked with creating a sustainable and innovative business model. A second center was established in Shanghai in 2007 and in 2008, another location was founded in Munich. The centers in New Delhi and Seoul followed in 2013, although the New Delhi location was changed to Bangalore soon after. 10 years after the first Innovation Centre Denmark was launched, the sixth Innovation Centre was established in 2016 in Tel Aviv. Finally, the newest center in Boston was founded in 2019.

== Organization ==
Innovation Centre Denmark is a cooperation between the Ministry of Foreign Affairs of Denmark and the Danish Ministry of Higher Education and Science.

== Objectives ==
The objective of Innovation Centre Denmark is to operate as the link between the companies, investors, research and innovation communities in Denmark and the other countries where the Innovation Centers are located. As part of this role, the objective is to facilitate the entry of high-potential Danish companies and attract inbound investment into Denmark.

The focus is on innovation and high-growth sectors such as information and communications technology, life sciences, clean technology and sustainable energy solutions, and subfields such as financial technology.
