= Mesograzer =

Category of herbivorous animals

Mesograzers are defined as small invertebrate herbivores less than 2.5 cm in length (i.e., 1 inch), and can include juveniles of some larger species. The feeding behaviour of these small invertebrate herbivores is what classifies them as mesograzers. They are commonly found abundantly on microalgae, seagrass beds, giant kelp, and coral reefs globally, since these are their main food sources and habitats. Their foraging behaviour consists of grazing on the organism they are living on, and populations can reach densities of tens of thousands of mesograzers per meter of habitat. They experience predation from micro-carnivorous fish that help regulate the abundance of kelp and other common food sources of mesograzers by controlling the population of mesograzers; consequently, grazing is an important process linking aquatic vegetation to higher trophic levels. Mesograzers can have an important top-down effect on marine communities, depending on the diversity and presence of predators. Mesograzers are often overlooked in scientific research, despite evidence that their foraging can have substantial effects on the populations of their common food sources. They both positively and negatively affect macroalgal performance and productivity through grazing on algae (i.e., negative effect), or through removing epiphytes (i.e., positive effects). Mesograzers often occupy enemy-free spaces by living on, and thereby feeding on, marine vegetation that uses chemical defenses to deter larger, more mobile consumers.

Mesograzers are quite common in the marine environment, common examples of mesograzers are small Gastropoda, Amphipoda, Isopoda, and small Crustaceans.

== Diet ==
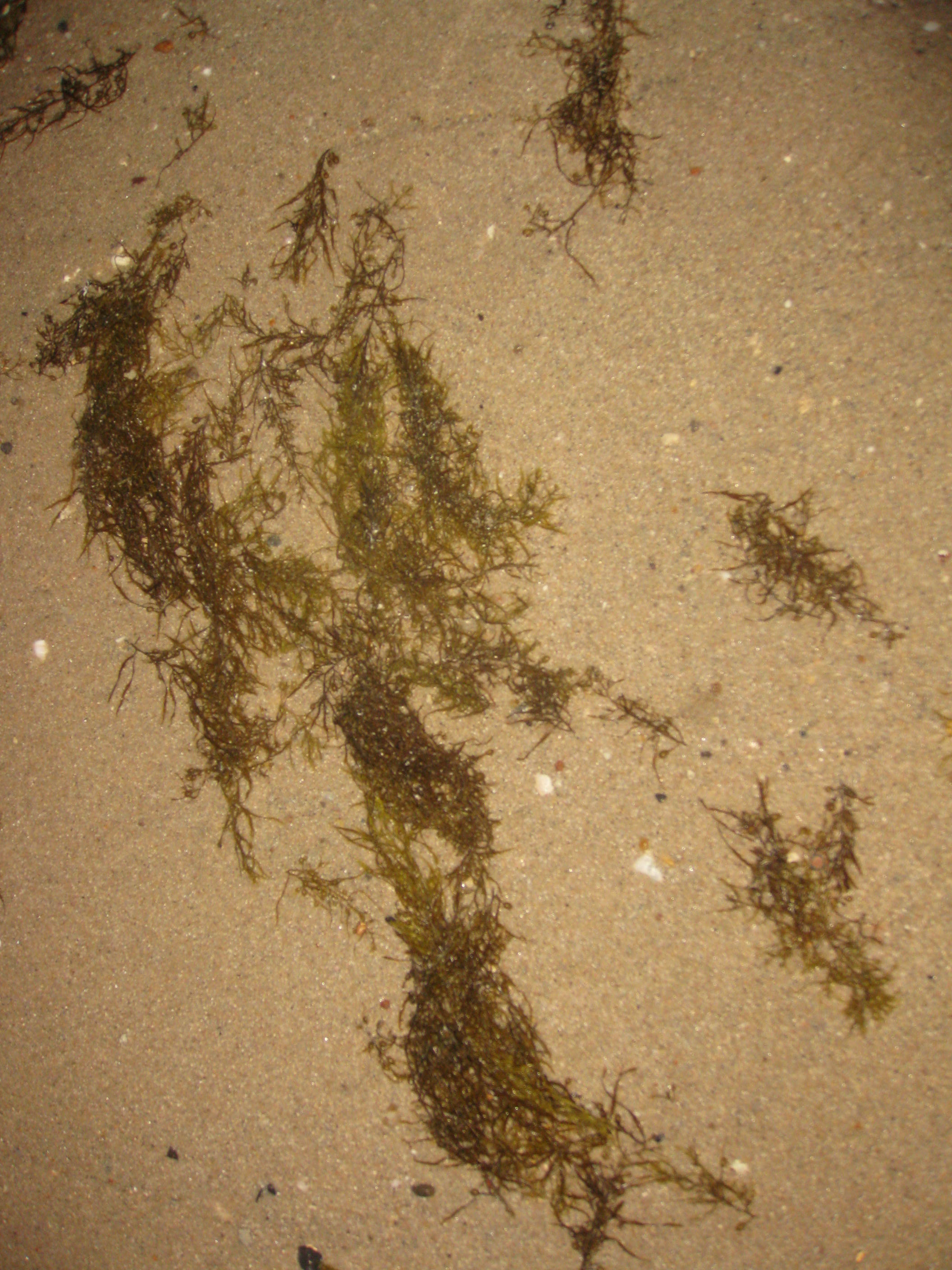
Sea grass washed ashore

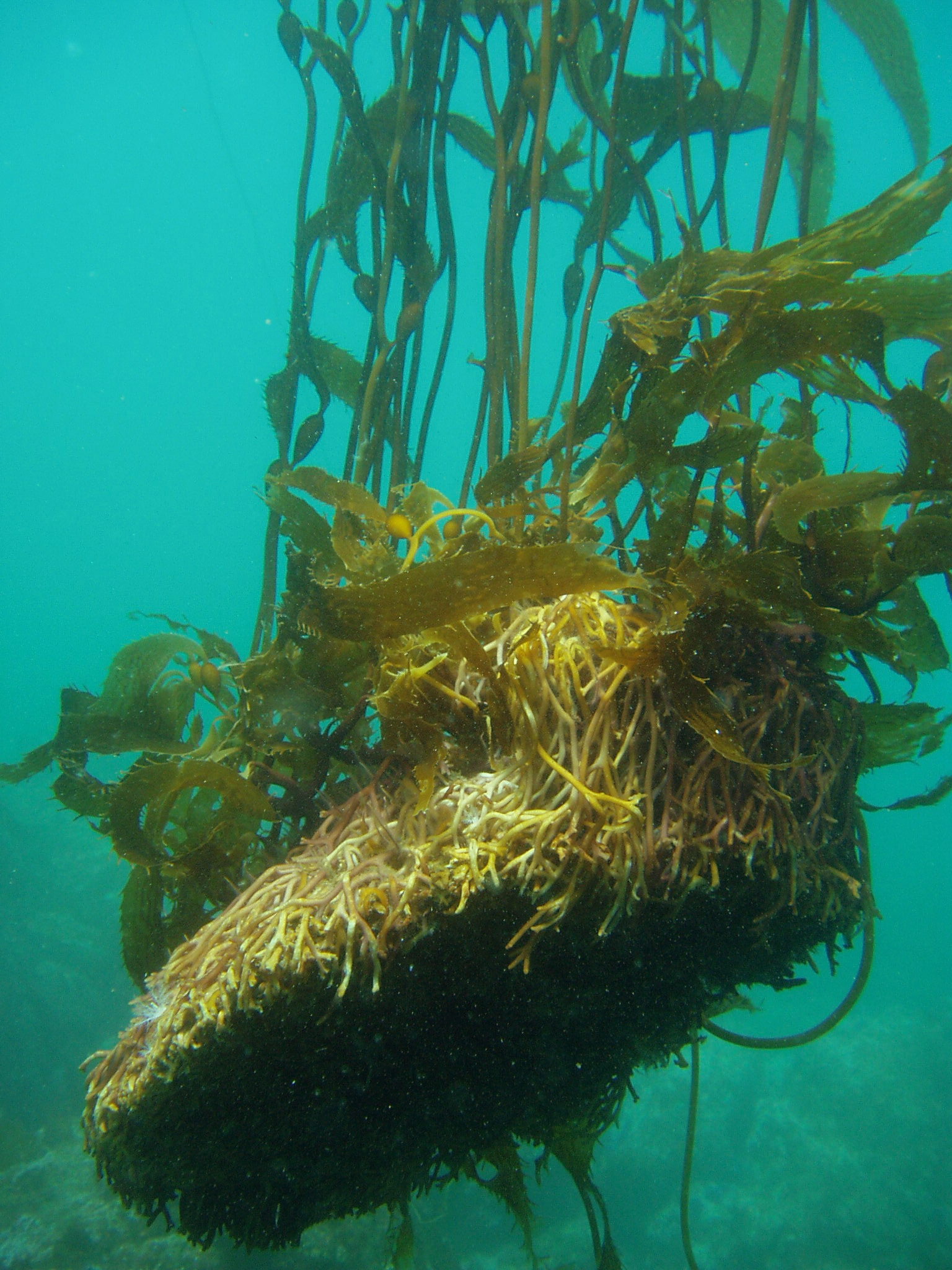
Giant kelp (Macrocystis pyrifera) holdfast torn from the bottom by a storm. California Channel Islands NMS.

Mesograzers consume a variety of marine vegetation. They typically use the same marine plant as both their habitat and food source. Many mesograzers have been found on sea grass beds. They are also quite known for destroying large populations of giant kelp, as this is another popular source for mesograzers. Other common food sources of mesograzers are coral reefs and macroalgal. They can be found living and feeding on these marine plants worldwide. Mesograzers have even been shown to consume invasive species of microalgae.

== Ecological role ==
There is little understanding of mesograzers' ecological role. Examination of mesograzer outbreaks in natural, as well as aquacultural settings suggests that they have the potential to alter the abundance of algal. However, the rarity of such events infers that the impact of mesograzers is more than likely insignificant. Nonetheless, observations alone are not significant enough to quantify their ecological role. Many researchers have tried to determine community-wide effects of mesograzers in laboratory studies. This has proven to be difficult due to high spatial and temporal variation in the density of mesograzers, variation in feeding behaviour, along with variable relationships between plant fitness and mesograzers consumption rates. These factors make it difficult to replicate a mesograzers natural environment in a laboratory setting. This difficulty lends to the low understanding of mesograzers ecological role in marine communities. The strongest evidence for mesograzers altering a marine community thus far demonstrates the ability of mesograzers to limit populations of algal epiphytes, which in turn shows benefits for sea grass. However, there is a high need for further field research in this area.

== In gastropods ==
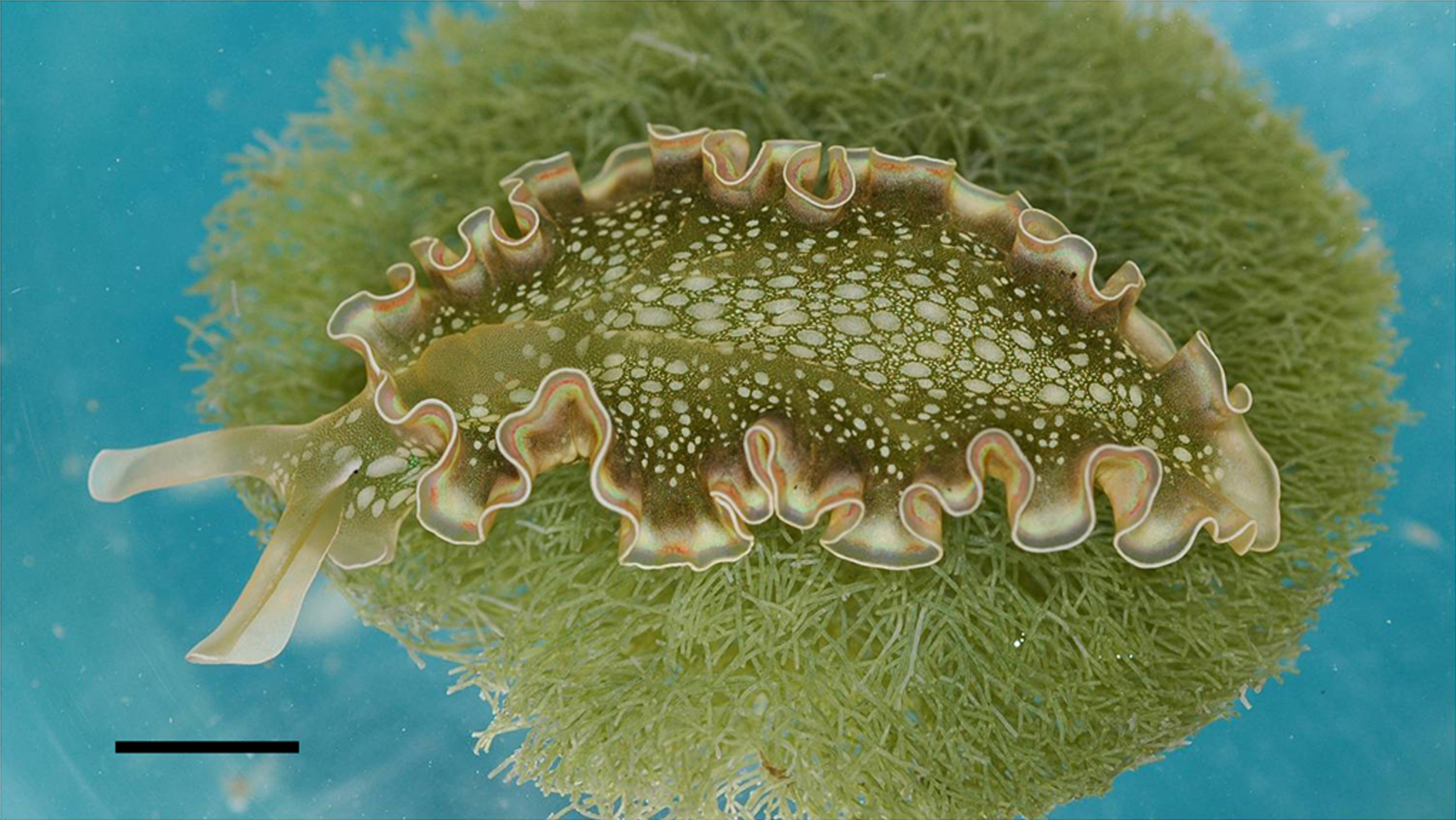
Dorsal view of Elysia clarki on the algal food source Penicillus capitatus. The scale bar is 5 mm.

Grazing herbivorous gastropods are known as mesograzers. They are commonly known to graze upon epilithic microalgae on rocky shores. The grazing gastropods in these regions are exposed to daily exposure to air, as well as immersion in seawater, due to the tides. Intertidal grazing gastropods can therefore get their food from epilithic microalgae and planktonic microalgae deposited during the tidal shift. However, they obtain most of their food by grazing on the microalgae on the rock surface. The algae availability along with feeding capability will determine the diets of the gastropod grazers on rocky shores. Different gastropod grazers with varying radula morphology are known to use the same food source. A possible explanation is that the gastropods may find differentiating between the various types of microalgae in their environment quite difficult.

The marine vegetation consumed by grazing gastropods occasionally produces chemical deterrents to prevent mesograzers from feeding on them. Different gastropod grazers elicit different plant responses.

== In crustaceans ==
Many crustacean species depend largely on animals as their food source, however others feed on pure algal diets (e.g., certain cyclopoids). Different species of cyclopoid have various mouth parts. This affects if they are grazers or predators, and if grazers, what vegetation they will prefer to graze on. Temperature also has an effect on the grazing behaviour of certain small crustaceans. The relationship between algal and grazer typically shifts with the seasons.

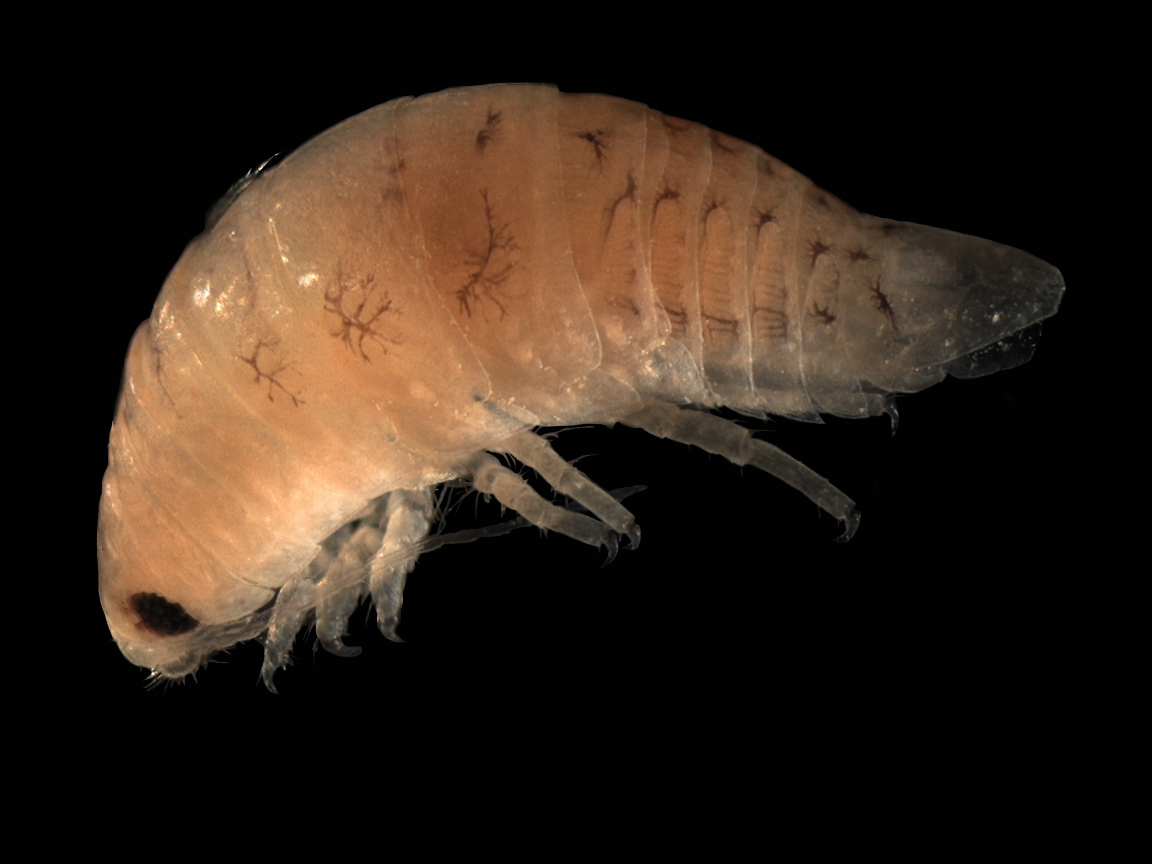
Eurydice affinis Marine isopod from the Belgian Continental Shelf 2003. Camera mounted on a Zeiss Stemi C-2000 binocular microscope. Length: ~3 mm.

=== Isopoda ===
Isopoda are an order of crustacean commonly known as mesograzers, due to their general small size and grazing herbivorous feeding behaviour. The mechanisms affecting their habitat choice and grazing in sea grass meadows is affected by the latitude. For isopod grazers, food type is considered a universal mechanism in determining the presence of these grazers on sea grass meadows. Food is more important than shelter, in the absence of predators, regarding habitat choice. Many factors, such as food quality, location, predation, plant morphology, and physiology of the isopod affect food, thus habitat choice. Isopod grazers typically respond to substances excreted by their food source, particularly epiphytes alone do not attract isopods (e.g., snails).

=== Amphipoda ===
Amphipoda are an order of crustacean that typically graze on algae, considering them mesograzers. Due to global stressors, the population main food sources for amphipods, such as algae, have seen some fluctuation. To ensure they are feeding on the best algae, amphipods have many strategies to picking algae to graze on. To optimize their diet they choose the most nutritive algae, or they increase their consumption rate and/or absorption efficiency while grazing on less nutrient rich algae. These amphipod mesograzers use their host vegetation as both food and habitat, therefore the extent of their impact on benthic communities is related to patterns of host use by these consumers. Food and shelter have been defined as the main factors determining these amphipods' host.
