= Wendell L. Roelofs =

American researcher

Wendell Lee Roelofs
- Born: July 26, 1938 (age 88); Orange City, Iowa
- Education: bachelor's degree (chemistry, 1960); PhD 1964; NIH post doctoral fellowship
- Alma mater: Central College in Pella, Iowa; Indiana University Bloomington; Massachusetts Institute of Technology
- Occupation: biochemist
- Employer(s): Cornell University College of Agriculture and Life Sciences; Department of Entomology-Geneva
- Known for: Developed insect sex attractants for pest control
- Title: Liberty Hyde Bailey Professor of Insect Biochemistry
- Political party: Republican
- Spouse(s): Marilyn Joyce Kuiken (c:a 1960 until ?); Donna R. Gray (1989 until ?); Joanna Roelofs, January 13, 2005
- Children: Brenda Jo, Caryn Jean, Jeffrey Lee, and Kevin Jon
- Parent(s): Edward and Edith Beyers Roelofs
- Relatives: two brothers, one chemist, the other an electrical engineer
- Awards: 1973 J Everett Bussart Award, Entomol Soc Am; 1977 Alexander von Humboldt Award; 1990 Silver Medal, Int Soc Chem Ecol; 1982 Wolf Prize in Agriculture; 1983 National Medal of Science; 2001 American Chemical Society's Kenneth A. Spencer Award in agricultural chemistry 1985 DSc, Central College 1988 Hobart and William Smith Colleges; 1988 Indiana University; 1989 Lund University, Sweden; 1989 Free University Brussels, Belgium

Wendell L. Roelofs (born July 26, 1938) was the first researcher to characterize insect sex pheromone structures, developing microchemical techniques for the isolation and identification of pheromone components.

== Education and career ==
Roelofs obtained his Bachelor of Science in chemistry in 1960 from Central College in Pella, Iowa and his Doctor of Philosophy in organic chemistry from Indiana University Bloomington in 1964. He is the Liberty Hyde Bailey Professor of Insect Biochemistry in the Department of Entomology at Cornell University in Ithaca, New York.

In his spare time, Roelofs coache[d] a youth league football team of kids aged eleven and twelve. Roelofs likened a cooperative effort in the laboratory to teamwork in football. With a coach's natural ability, he fostered an atmosphere where people could contribute their academic strengths and interests. "With our wide range of interests, we can always follow the most interesting lead whether it's my area of expertise or not," .... "That's how we stay at the forefront. It's synergistic. There's more creativity among us all."

== Award ==
Roelofs received the Wolf Prize in Agriculture in 1982, and the National Medal of Science from President Ronald Reagan in 1983.
