= Myrmecotrophy =

Ability of plants to obtain nutrients from ants

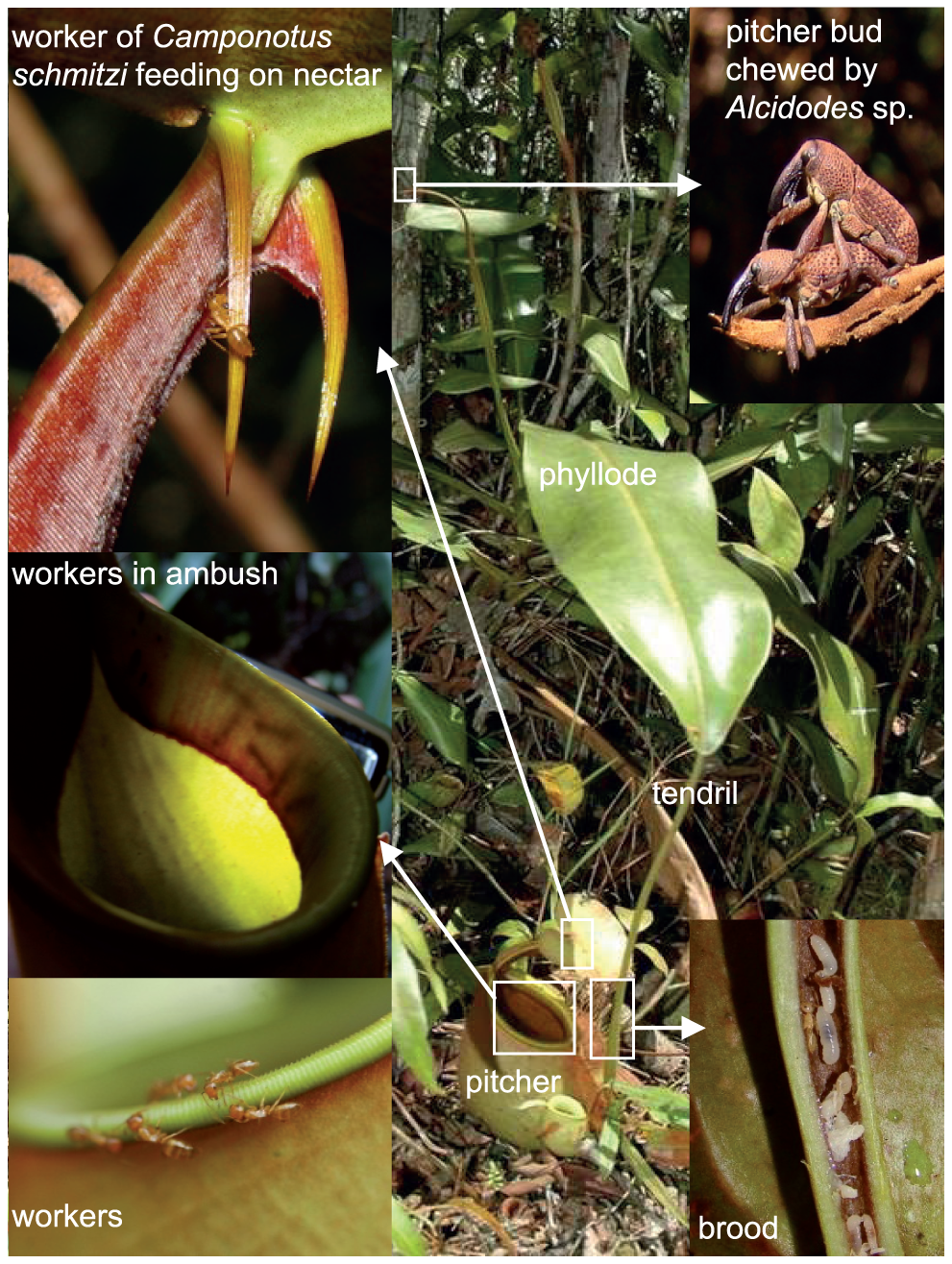
Camponotus schmitzi in association with its myrmecophyte host, Nepenthes bicalcarata

Myrmecotrophy is the ability of plants to obtain nutrients from ants, a form of mutualism. Due to this behaviour the invasion of vegetation into harsh environments is promoted. The dead remains of insects thrown out by the ants are absorbed by the lenticular warts in myrmecophytes like Hydnophytum and Myrmecodia. Myrmecodia uses its lenticular warts to suck nutrients from the insects thrown out by the ants. The ants in turn benefit with a secure location to form their colony. The pitcher plant Nepenthes bicalcarata obtains an estimated 42% of its total foliar nitrogen from ant waste.
