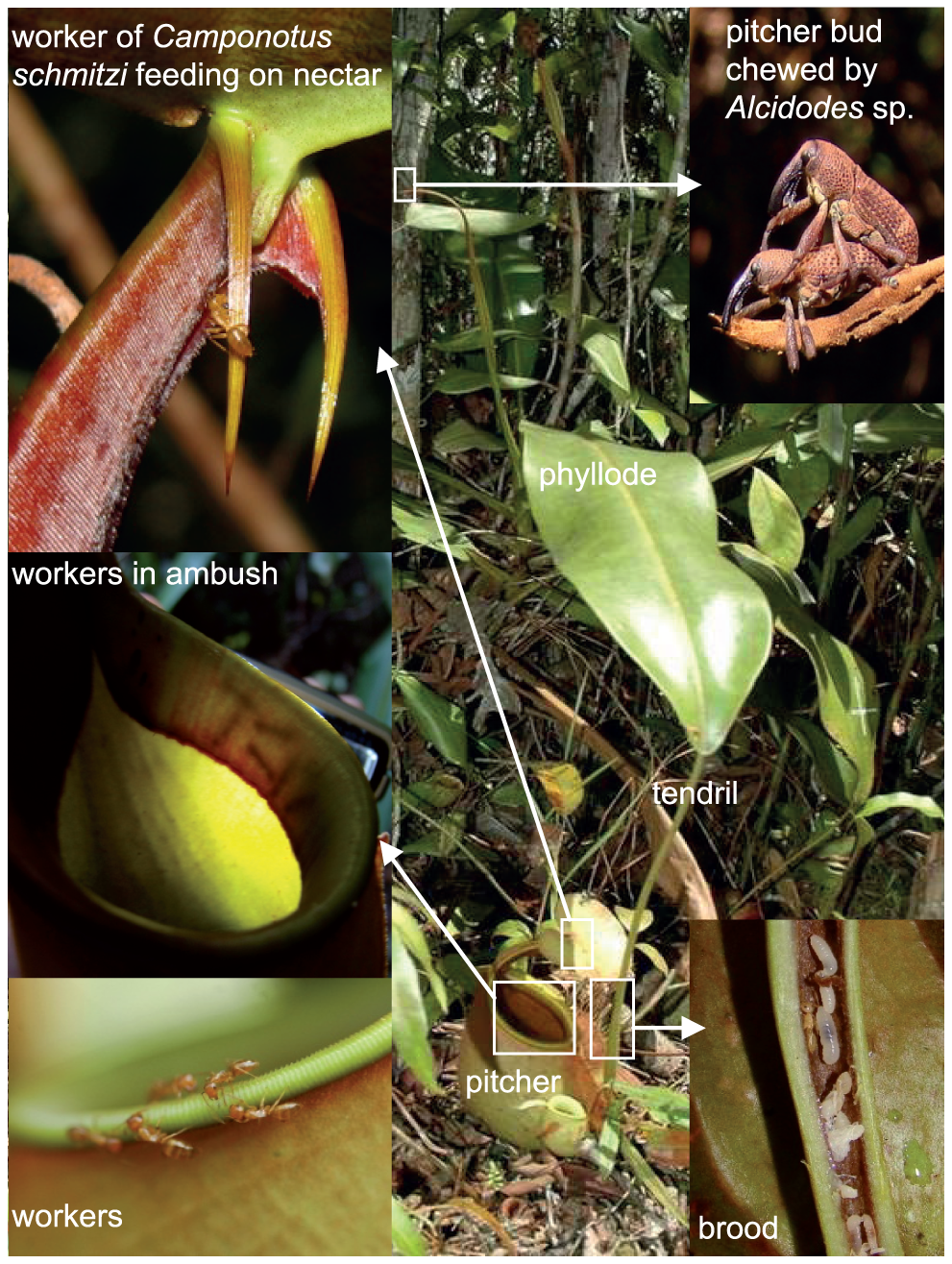
- Colobopsis schmitzi in association with its host plant, Nepenthes bicalcarata

Scientific classification
- Kingdom: Animalia
- Phylum: Arthropoda
- Class: Insecta
- Order: Hymenoptera
- Family: Formicidae
- Subfamily: Formicinae
- Genus: Colobopsis
- Species: C. schmitzi

Binomial name
- Colobopsis schmitzi (Stärcke, 1933)

Synonyms
- Camponotus schmitzi Stärcke, 1933

= Colobopsis schmitzi =

Species of diving ant

Colobopsis schmitzi, synonym Camponotus schmitzi, is a species of ant native to Borneo, which is commonly known as the diving ant, swimming ant or pitcher-plant ant, due to their habit of diving into the digestive fluids of their plant host Nepenthes bicalcarata. They are endemic to the island of Borneo.

== Description ==
C. schmitzi closely resemble Colobopsis ceylonicus but are slightly larger. They have rectangular heads about one and a half times as long as they are wide. The mandibles have five teeth each (except for the minor workers which have four). The eyes are widely separated and located laterally, slightly behind the anterior bulge of the head. The antennae are short, with a scape at 1 mm (0.039 in) in length. The funicules are longer than they are wide proximally and become shorter and wider towards the tip. The body is smooth and shiny. The gaster is small. The legs are relatively large, especially the femurs, and very compressed laterally. Spines are present near the distal tip of the femurs and absent in the tibiae. The tarsi are longer than the tibiae.

C. schmitzi exhibit polymorphism, with three physical castes - minor, median, and major ("soldier") workers. The queen averages at a length of 8 mm (0.31 in) with wings measuring 7 mm (0.28 in) long. The major and median workers are both 6.5 mm (0.26 in) in length, while the minor workers are 4 to 5 mm (0.16 to 0.20 in) long. They are brownish-yellow to reddish-orange in color; the head and gaster are darker than the rest of the body.

The larvae are typical of Camponotus larvae - cylindrical in shape with the head and mouthparts bent at a 90 degree angle from the body.

== Distribution and habitat ==
Colobopsis schmitzi inhabits the hollow tendrils of the plant Nepenthes bicalcarata. It is only found in association with N. bicalcarata, which is endemic to the island of Borneo.

== Taxonomy ==
Camponotus schmitzi Stärcke, 1933, is now classified in the genus Colobopsis, which was formerly treated as a subgenus of Camponotus, tribe Camponotini, and subfamily Formicinae of the ant family Formicidae. It was first collected by the botanist Jan Pieter Schuitemaker and described by the myrmecologist August Stärcke in 1933 as Camponotus schmitzi.

== Myrmecotrophic mutualism ==
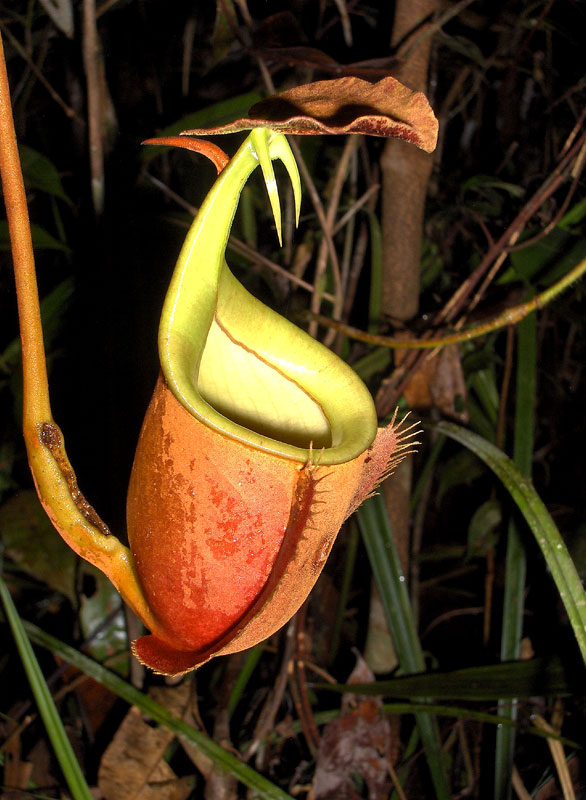
Intermediate pitcher of Nepenthes bicalcarata with swollen tendril colonised by Colobopsis schmitzi. The brown scar tissue results from a wound, not from the ants' drilling.

The ant makes its nest in the hollow tendrils of the pitcher plant Nepenthes bicalcarata. This unique animal-plant interaction was noted by Frederick William Burbidge as early as 1880. In 1904, Odoardo Beccari suggested that the ants feed on insects found on and around the plant, but may fall prey to it themselves. In 1990, B. Hölldobler and E. O. Wilson proposed that N. bicalcarata and C. schmitzi form a mutually beneficial association. At the time, however, no experimental data existed to support such a hypothesis. A series of observations and experiments carried out in Brunei by Charles Clarke in 1992 and 1998, and by Clarke and Kitching in 1993 and 1995, strongly support the mutualism theory.

The ants feed by descending into the pitcher fluid and retrieving arthropods caught by the plant. The ants seem to ignore smaller insects and only target larger prey items. Hauling food from the pitcher fluid to the peristome, a distance of no more than 5 cm (2.0 in), may take up to 12 hours. In this way the contents of N. bicalcarata pitchers is controlled such that organic matter does not accumulate to the point of putrefaction, which can lead to the demise of pitcher infauna (which also appear to benefit the plant) and sometimes the pitcher itself.

The ants seem to favour upper pitchers and rarely colonise lower pitchers. This is likely because terrestrial traps are periodically submerged in water during heavy rains. Flooding of the ants' nest chamber could result in the death of the developing eggs, larvae, and pupae.

C. schmitzi nests solely in the tendrils of N. bicalcarata and rarely ventures onto other plants. The species is completely dependent on N. bicalcarata for food and domicile. N. bicalcarata, on the other hand, is able to survive and reproduce without the presence of the ants; it is a facultative mutualist. This being the case, there appear to be few mature plants over 2 m (6.6 ft) in height not colonised by C. schmitzi.

John Thompson suggests that N. bicalcarata may be the only plant species that obtains nutrients through both insect capture and ant-hosting habits.

In addition to Clarke & Kitching (1995), three more theories have been investigated so far to explain the symbiotic relationship between ant and plant. In an exclusion experiment it was shown that plants without C. schmitzi receive greater herbivory damage, and the ants seem to specifically attack a certain weevil (Alcidodes sp.) that feeds on pitcher plants. Furthermore, data has been collected that hints to an aggressiveness of C. schmitzi against prey animals that try to escape from the pitchers, thus enhancing the retention rate. Another mechanism appears to be a host-cleaning behaviour of C. schmitzi: the ants remove debris and mold from the peristome, which thus remains smooth and slippery and has a longer operational lifespan.

== See also ==
- Nepenthes infauna
- Myrmecophyte
- Mutualism (biology)
