= Ants of the Democratic Republic of the Congo =

There are 803 species of ants currently known in the Democratic Republic of the Congo. Unusually, there are no known introduced species in this region. The majority of species occur in the Congolese rainforest and Central Congolian lowland forests.

== Research ==
The species in this region were primarily identified by the scientists Felix Santschi and Auguste Forel in the early 20th century who later published on the taxonomy of the Democratic Republic of Congo's ants.

== Weaver ants (Oecophylla longinoda) ==
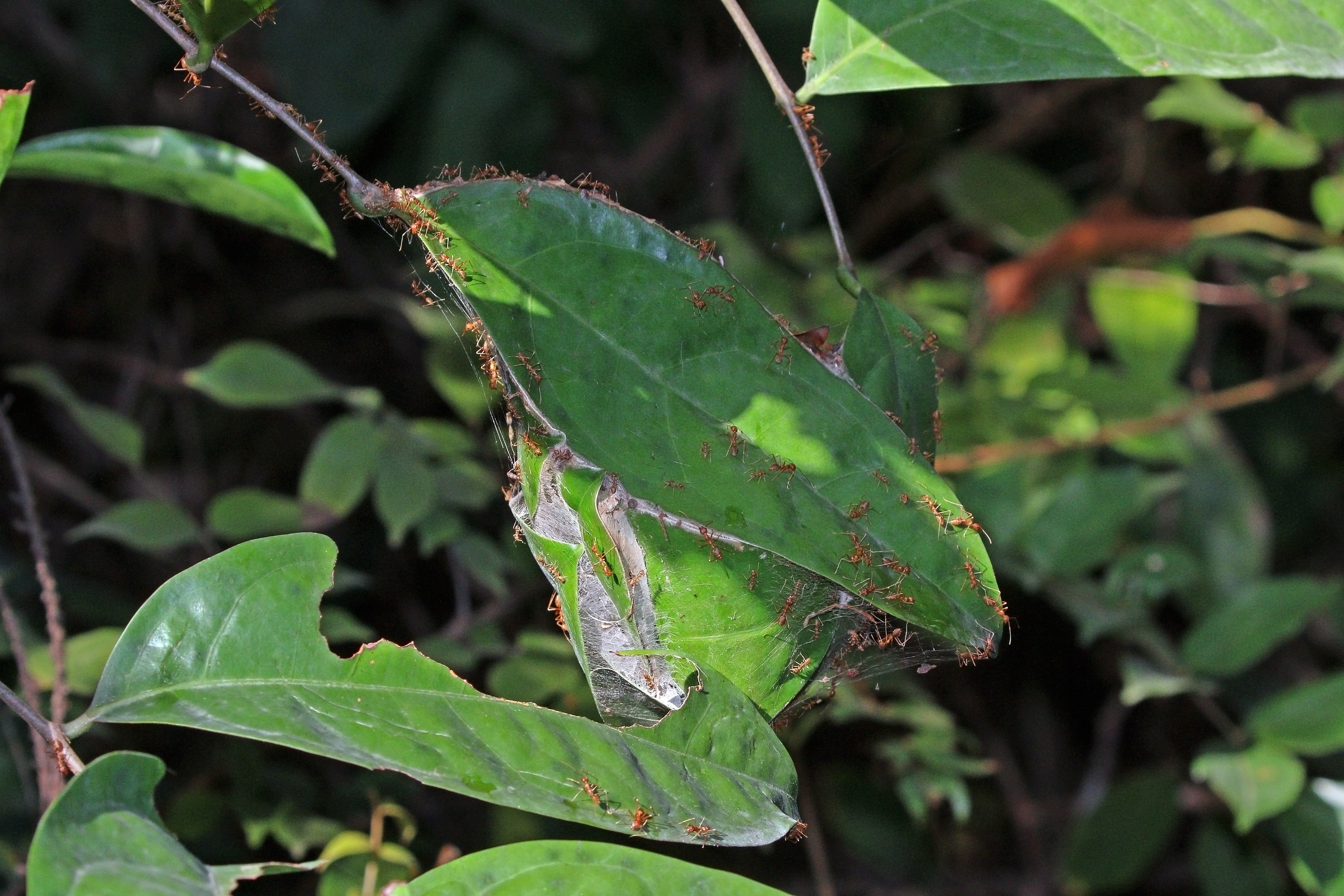
An Oecophylla longinoda nest in Ghana.

=== Behavior and overview ===
Oecophylla longinoda, commonly known as the African Weaver Ant, is distributed throughout the heavily forested areas of the region, most common in the congolian rainforest. They primarily feed on other insects and on the honeydew produced by scale insects. Oecophylla longinoda constructs leaf nests high in the canopy using its larvae to "weave" the leaves together.

Generally, one colony dominates each tree, and if that rule is broken, fights between colonies often occur, in which the ants will use their formic acid to attack each other.

== Driver ants (Dorylus wilverthi) ==
=== Overview ===
Dorylus wilverthi, more commonly known as the black driver ant is found throughout the forests of the area, and nests in large, temporary mounds. After enough food has been collected from the surrounding area, the colony moves on.

=== Behavior and size ===
Colony populations are often more than 6 million, and in some cases can exceed 10 million. The ants form large trails, led by the blind workers and defended by the large soldiers, through the leaf litter, clearing pathways and killing any insects they can find. They often consume termites or other ants, which they find by digging into and swarming the termites' or ants' large nests and stripping it clean of both workers and brood, a process called "raiding".

The species is highly polymorphic, and the queen of this species' genus is the largest recorded ant in history at 40 - 63 millimeters (1.5 - 2.4 inches) in body length.

== Bigheaded ants (Pheidole megacephala) ==
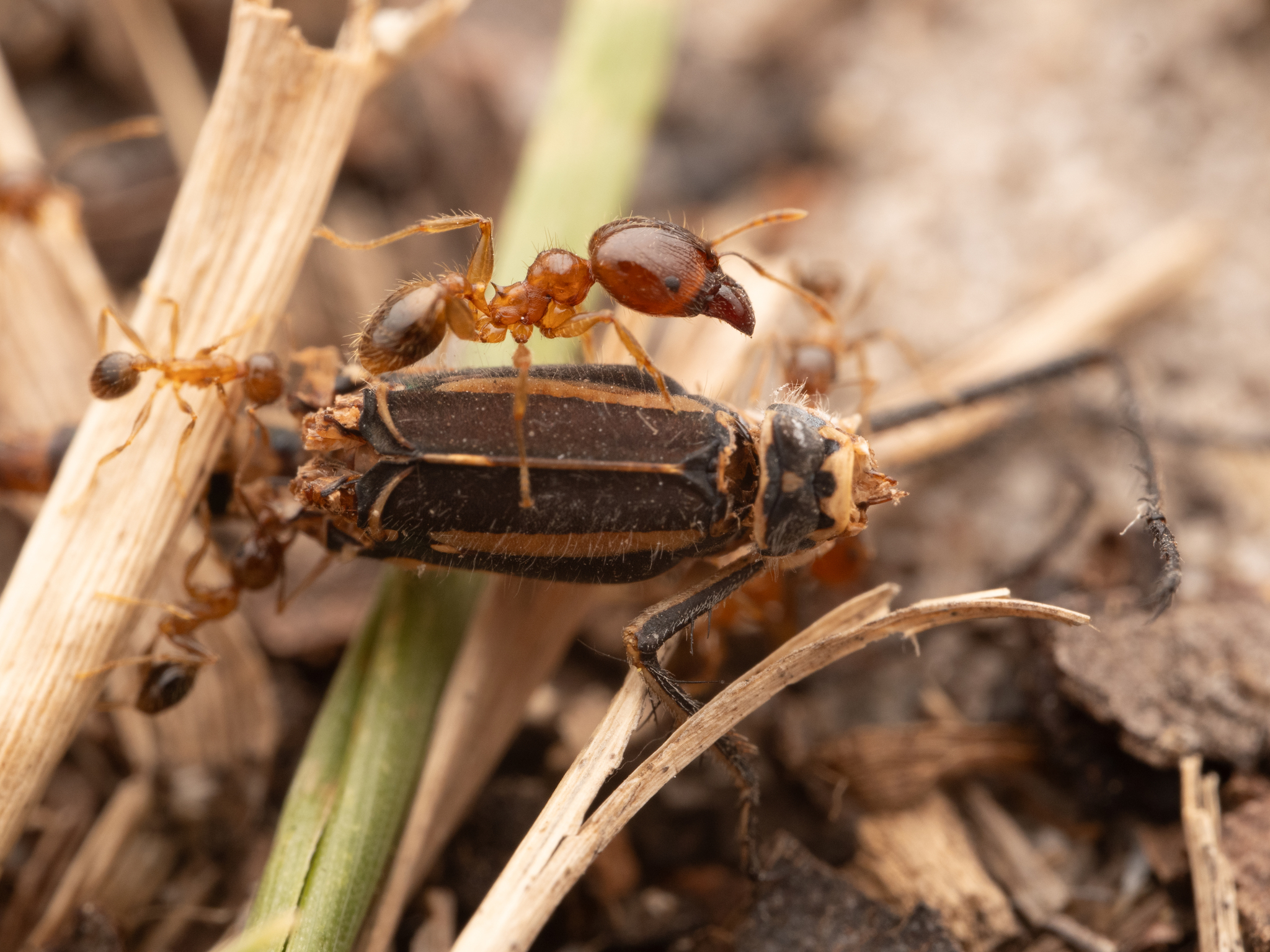
Several Pheidole megacephala workers and a large major.

=== Overview ===
The highly invasive species Pheidole megacephala is native to the rainforest of the area as well as some of the surrounding farmland.

It is primarily characterized by the difference between the small, weak workers, and the large-headed majors with crushing mandibles, earning them the name "Bigheaded ants". It nests in small mounds and is often seen climbing trees and other plants in search of sugars to feed the colony.

=== Distribution ===
The species has spread from this portion of Africa to most landmasses of the Earth, including the United States and Europe.

== Slender ants (Tetraponera aethiops) ==
=== Overview ===
Tetraponera aethiops, commonly found living exclusively on Barteria fistulosa trees, are often known as "Slender ants" due to their black, thin bodies. They spend most of their lives protecting their host tree, Barteria fistulosa and live inside the plant, viciously attacking anyone, or anything that comes near.

=== Impact of invasive species ===
The highly invasive species of ant, Wasmannia auropunctata, more commonly known as the Electric ant, recently spread to the western area of the country, as well as other countries that aethiops is native to such as Gabon, and since then, Tetraponera aethiops populations have been declining as the invasive species is more powerful and fast growing compared to aethiops. The small number of colonies that do occur in the invaded regions have much lower populations. Occurrences will likely decline more in future years as Wasmannia auropunctata's territory expands.
