= Streptomyces formicae =

Scientific classification
- Domain: Bacteria
- Kingdom: Bacillati
- Phylum: Actinomycetota
- Class: Actinomycetes
- Order: Streptomycetales
- Family: Streptomycetaceae
- Genus: Streptomyces
- Species: S. formicae

Binomial name
- Streptomyces formicae Bai et al. 2016

Type strain
- CGMCC 4.7277, DSM 100524, 1H-GS9

Species of bacterium

Streptomyces formicae is a species of bacteria from the genus Streptomyces, which has been isolated from the ant Camponotus japonicus in Harbin in China and the ant Tetraponera penzigi in Africa. The complete genome sequence of S. formicae was published in 2017.

== See also ==
- List of Streptomyces species
