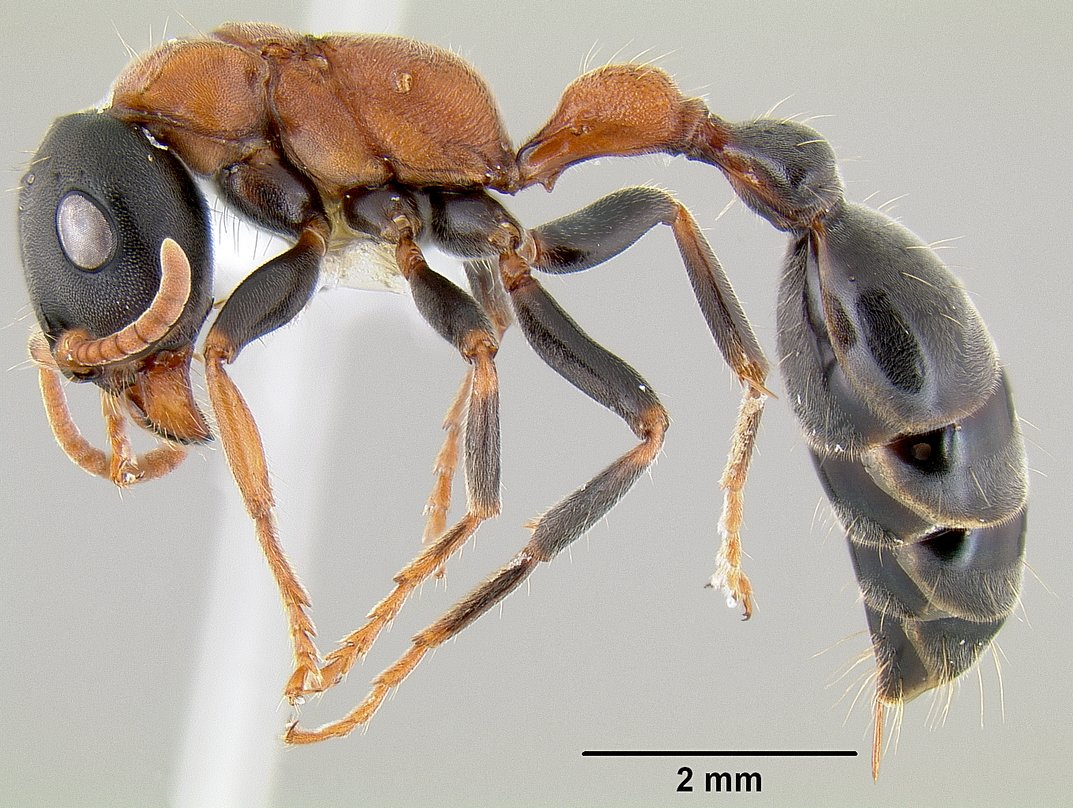
- Tetraponera rufonigra worker

Scientific classification
- Kingdom: Animalia
- Phylum: Arthropoda
- Clade: Pancrustacea
- Class: Insecta
- Order: Hymenoptera
- Family: Formicidae
- Genus: Tetraponera
- Species: T. rufonigra

Binomial name
- Tetraponera rufonigra (Jerdon, 1851)

Synonyms
- Sima rufonigra ceylonensis Forel, 1909; Sima rufonigra testaceonigra Forel, 1903; Sima rufonigra yeensis Forel, 1902

= Tetraponera rufonigra =

Species of ant

Tetraponera rufonigra, is a species of ant belonging to the subfamily Pseudomyrmecinae. It is distributed across Southeast Asia Commonly called the bi-coloured arboreal ant, they are arboreal and build small nests which are excavated holes usually in dried parts of trees. They are active hunters and hunt small insects. They have a well developed sting and when stung can cause allergic reactions in human beings.

The ant is known as "Hath polayaa" in Sinhala.

== Subspecies ==
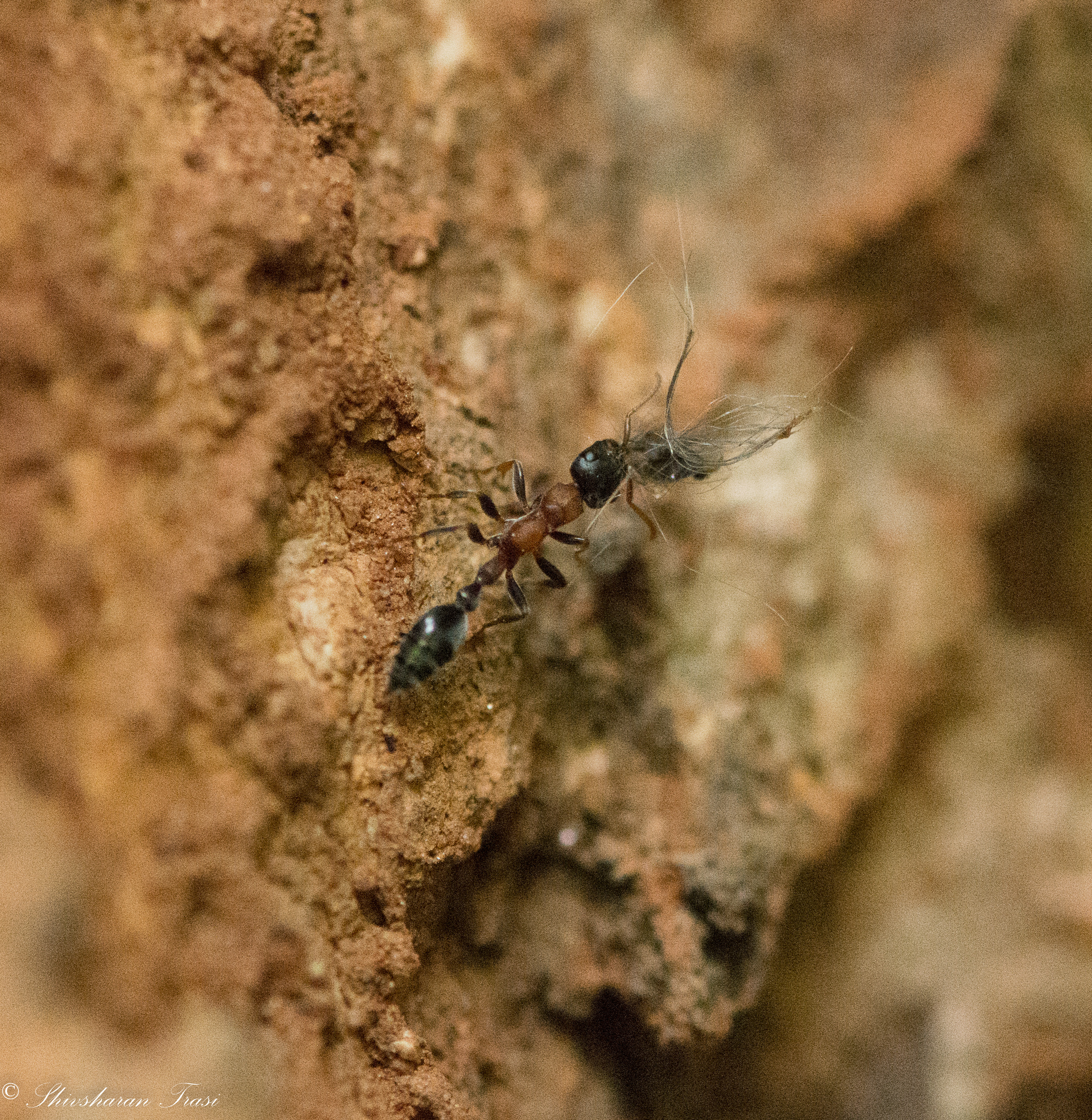
T. rufonigra forages

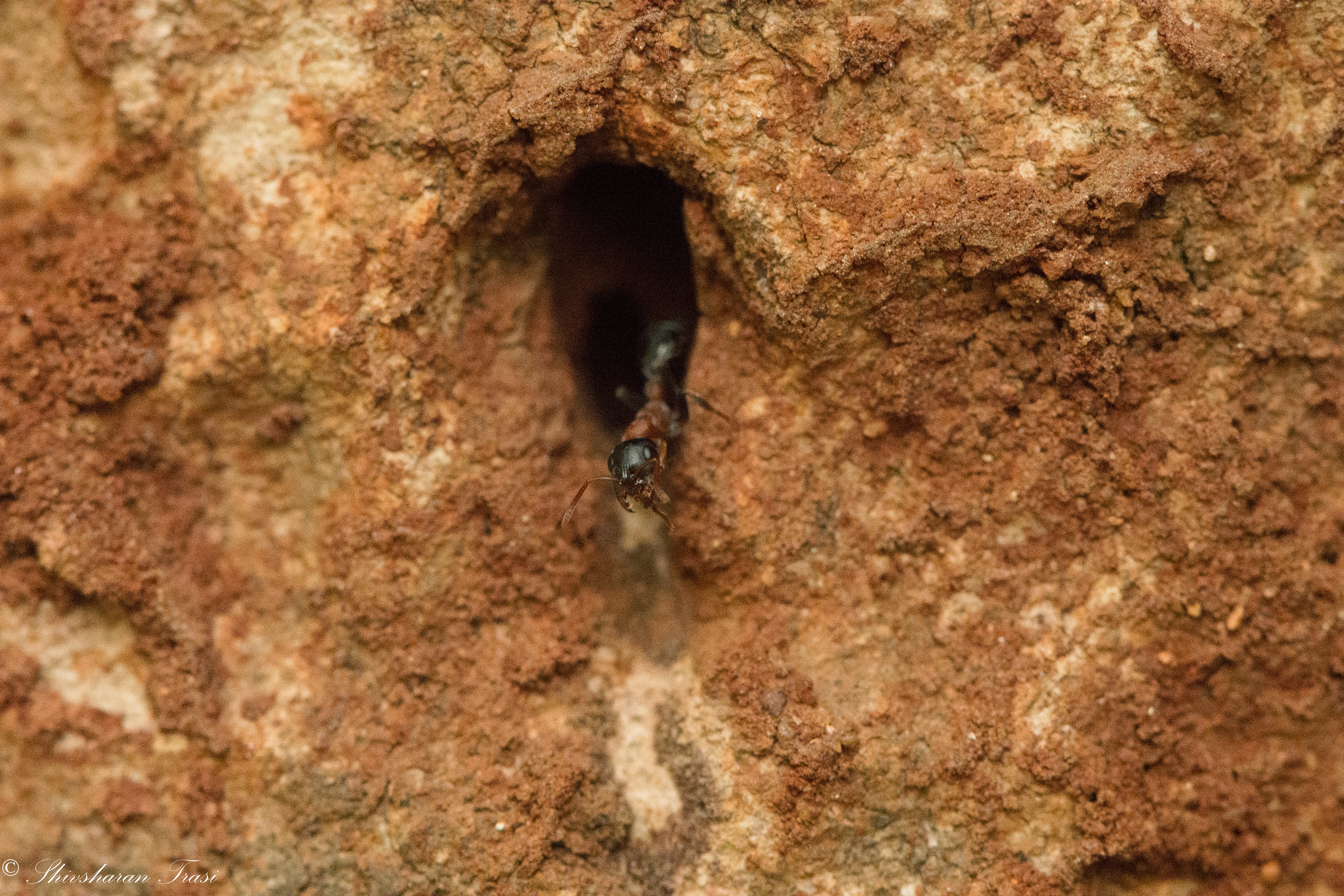
T. rufonigra nest

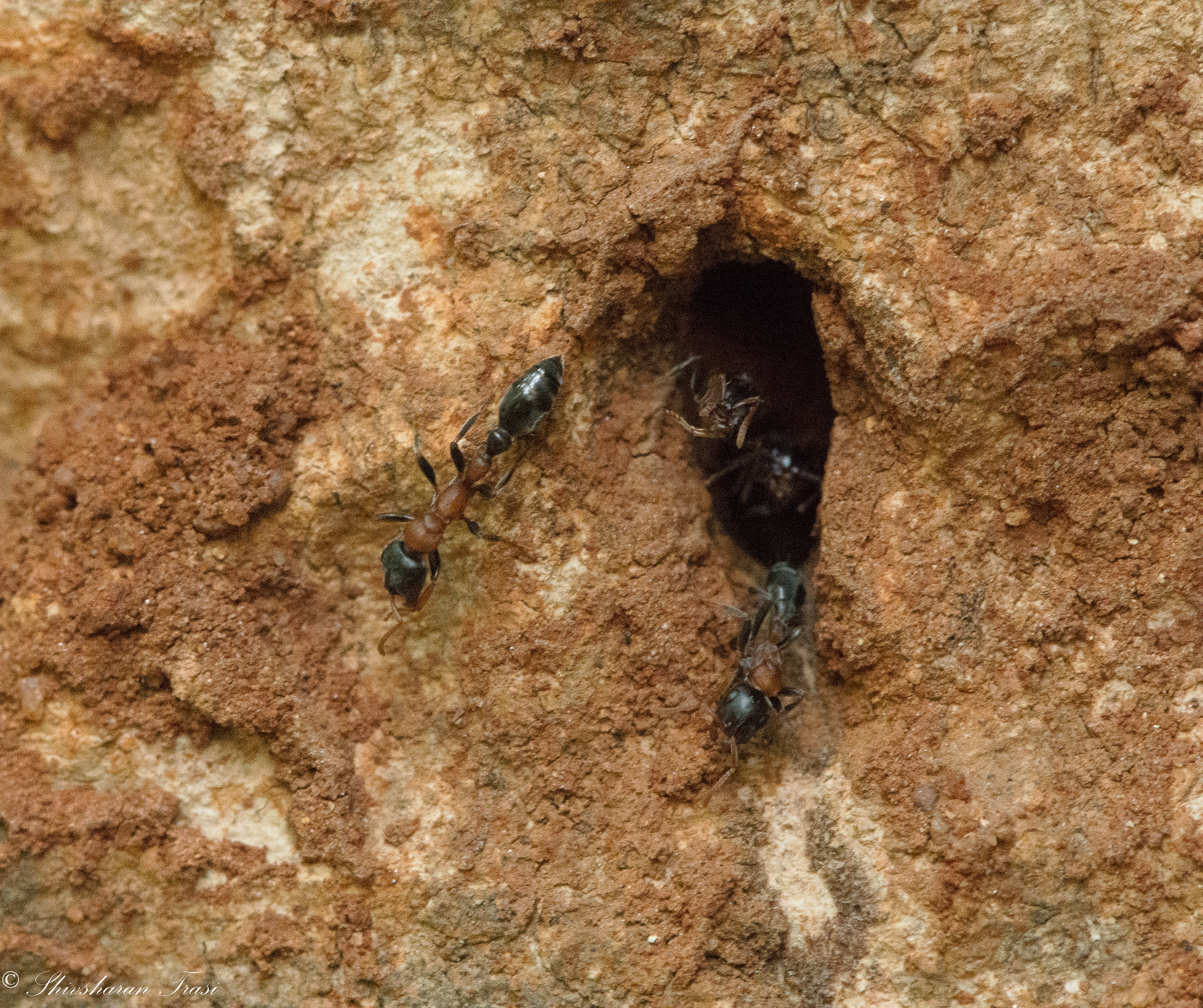
T. rufonigra nest in tree

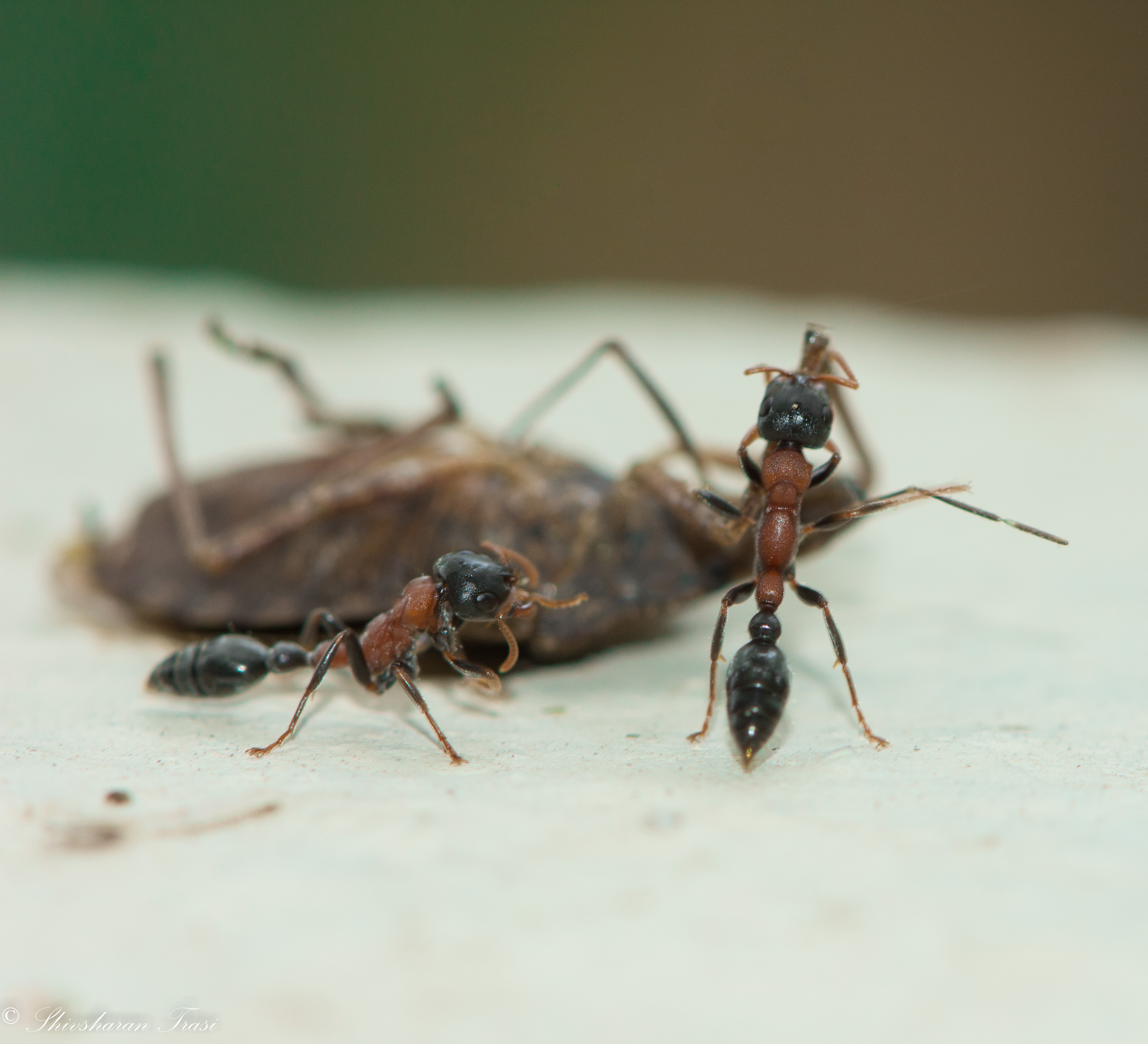
T. rufonigra

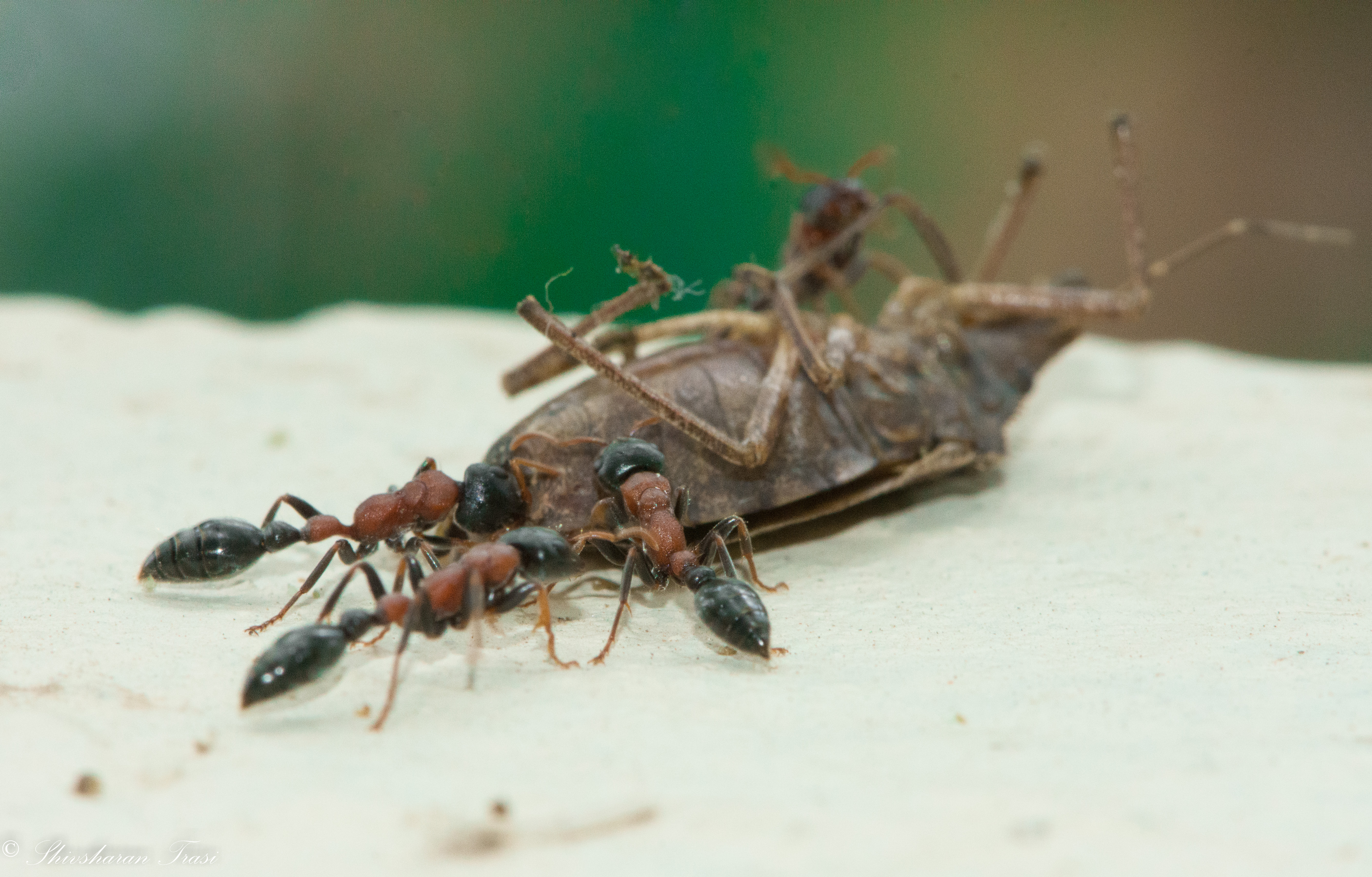
T. rufonigra feeding on beetle
- Tetraponera rufonigra ceylonensis (Forel, 1909)
- Tetraponera rufonigra rufonigra (Jerdon, 1851)
- Tetraponera rufonigra testaceonigra (Forel, 1903)
- Tetraponera rufonigra yeensis (Forel, 1902)
