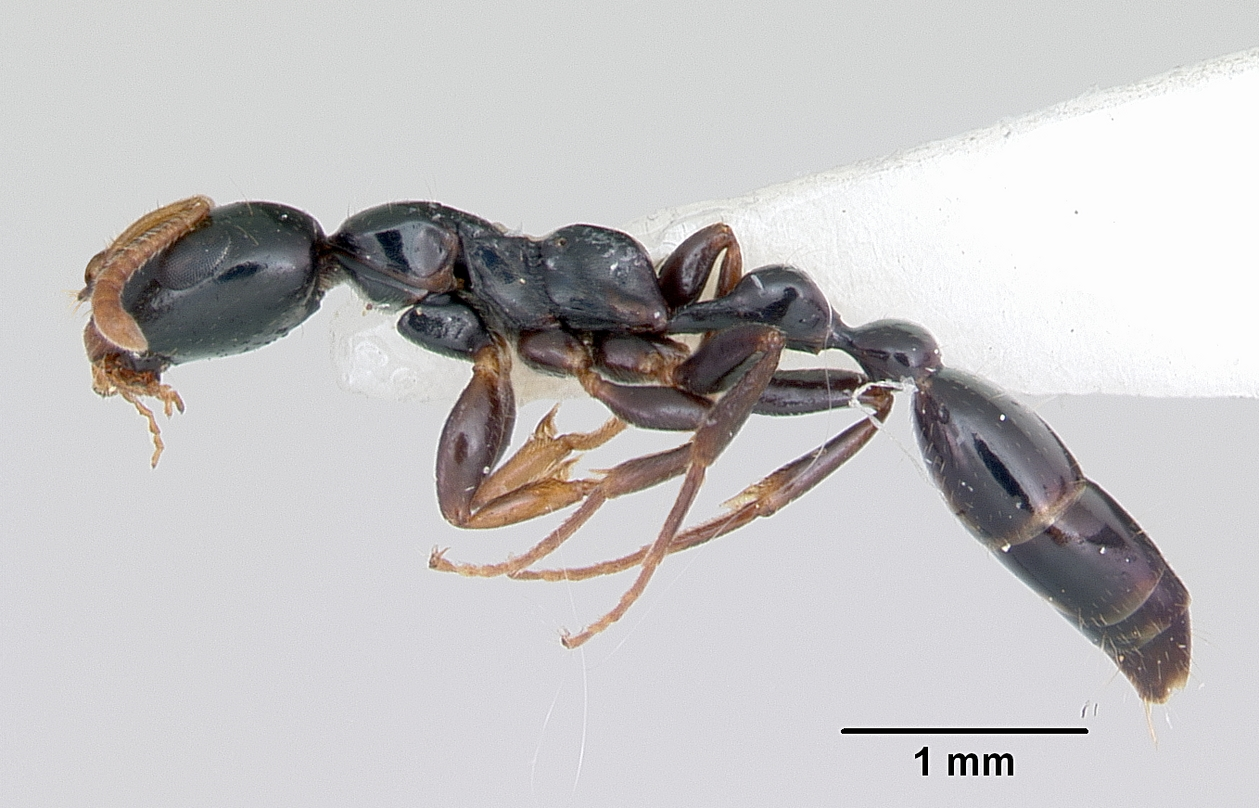
- T. allaborans worker

Scientific classification
- Kingdom: Animalia
- Phylum: Arthropoda
- Clade: Pancrustacea
- Class: Insecta
- Order: Hymenoptera
- Family: Formicidae
- Subfamily: Pseudomyrmecinae
- Tribe: Pseudomyrmecini
- Genus: Tetraponera
- Species: T. allaborans

Binomial name
- Tetraponera allaborans (Walker, 1859)

Synonyms
- Cerapachys ceylonica Motschoulsky, 1863; Cerapachys femoralis Motschoulsky, 1863; Eciton minutum Jerdon, 1851; Eciton rufipes Jerdon, 1851; Sima allaborans longinoda Forel, 1909; Sima allaborans sumatrensis Emery, 1900; Sima compressa Roger, 1863; Sima subtilis Emery, 1899

= Tetraponera allaborans =

Species of ant

Tetraponera allaborans, is a species of ant of the subfamily Myrmicinae, which can be found in many Asian countries.
