= Tetraponera tessmanni =

Scientific classification
- Kingdom: Animalia
- Phylum: Arthropoda
- Clade: Pancrustacea
- Class: Insecta
- Order: Hymenoptera
- Family: Formicidae
- Genus: Tetraponera
- Species: T. tessmanni

Binomial name
- Tetraponera tessmanni (Stitz, 1910)

Species of ant

Tetraponera tessmanni is a species of ant in the subfamily Pseudomyrmecinae. It is native to tropical Central Africa, where it inhabits the hollow stems of the liana Vitex thyrsiflora.

== Ecology ==
Tetraponera tessmanni has a symbiotic relationship with Vitex thyrsiflora, a liana of the tropical rain forests of West and Central Africa, which has hollow cavities in which the ant makes its nest. With most species of ant that live in association with trees, the ants prune the foliage of adjoining trees to prevent other ecologically dominant arboreal ants from invading their territory. That is not the case with T. tessmanni, because the very nature of a liana means it is constant contact with other vegetation. Instead, the ant has developed certain traits that enable it to maintain dominance and V. thyrsiflora can be considered a specialized myrmecophyte, because all mature specimens are found to be colonised by the ant.

Shoots of V. thyrsiflora consists of a series of nodes, and the ants create entrance holes at the node junctions, and link the nodes internally by chewing holes between them to form their domatia (specialised chambers adapted for habitation by ants). The nodes initially contain pith but this dries up in older shoots. Other insects are associated with plants and may try to colonise the nodes of V. thyrsiflora, but T. tessmanni is the only ant to create entrance holes (although this is also done by the beetle Ischnolanguria concolor). T. tessmanni is a very aggressive ant and seems capable of establishing its dominance over the liana, which may be 50 m (164 ft) or so long. The ant colony may occupy the whole liana as it grows and have multiple queens. The ants patrol the liana and drive away herbivorous insects, but they do not feed on honeydew or nectar, nor do they leave their host liana to obtain food elsewhere, but they seem to extract all their nourishment from the interior of the nodes which they rasp to create wound callus.

The ant larvae have their heads orientated ventrally, fleshy appendages on the thoracic and first abdominal segments, and hooked hairs on their dorsal surfaces, by which they are hung from the roof of the domatia. These appendages seem to act as a sort of gland known as an "exudia", with the larvae being fed by mouth and producing a fatty exudate from the gland which is licked off by the workers.
