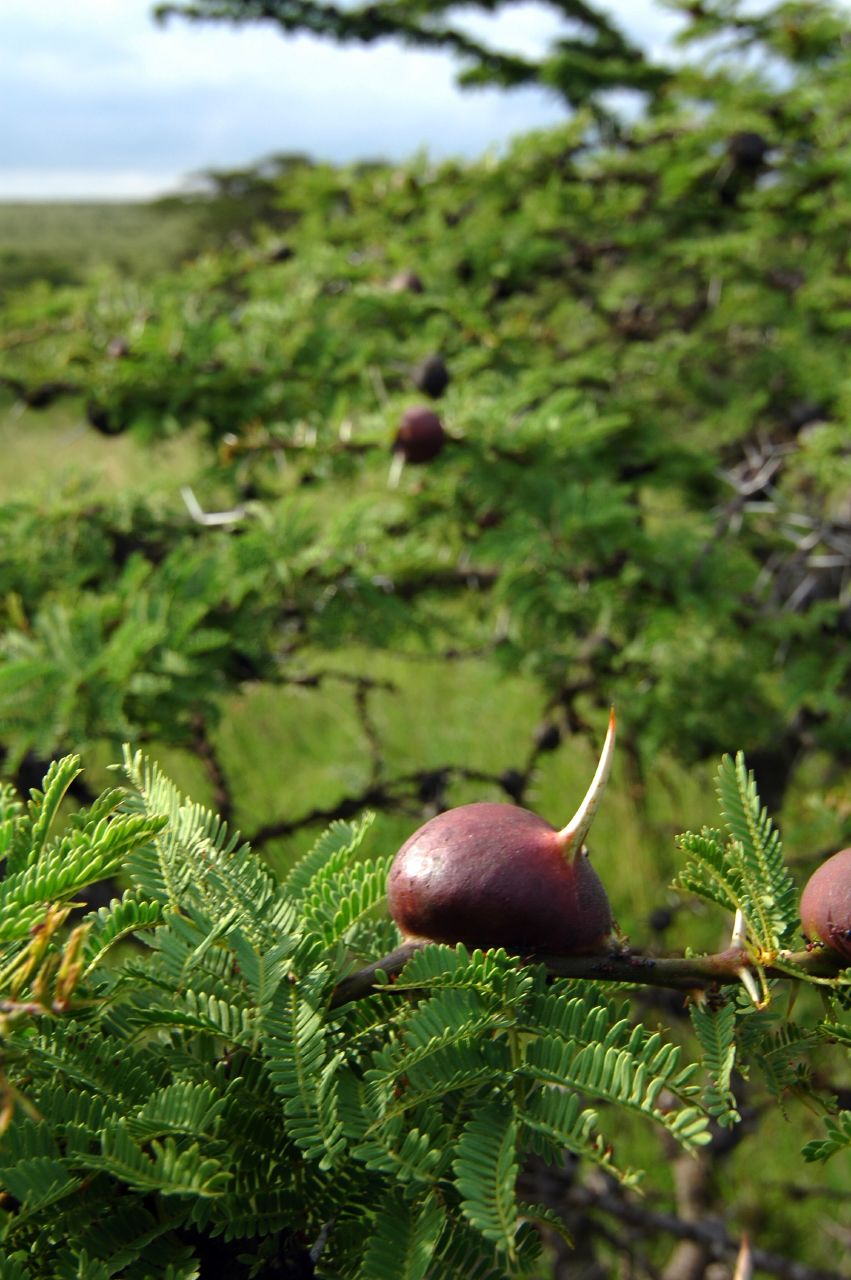

Conservation status
- Least Concern (IUCN 3.1)

Scientific classification
- Kingdom: Plantae
- Clade: Tracheophytes
- Clade: Angiosperms
- Clade: Eudicots
- Clade: Rosids
- Order: Fabales
- Family: Fabaceae
- Subfamily: Caesalpinioideae
- Clade: Mimosoid clade
- Genus: Vachellia
- Species: V. drepanolobium

Binomial name
- Vachellia drepanolobium (Harms ex Sjöstedt) P.J.H.Hurter
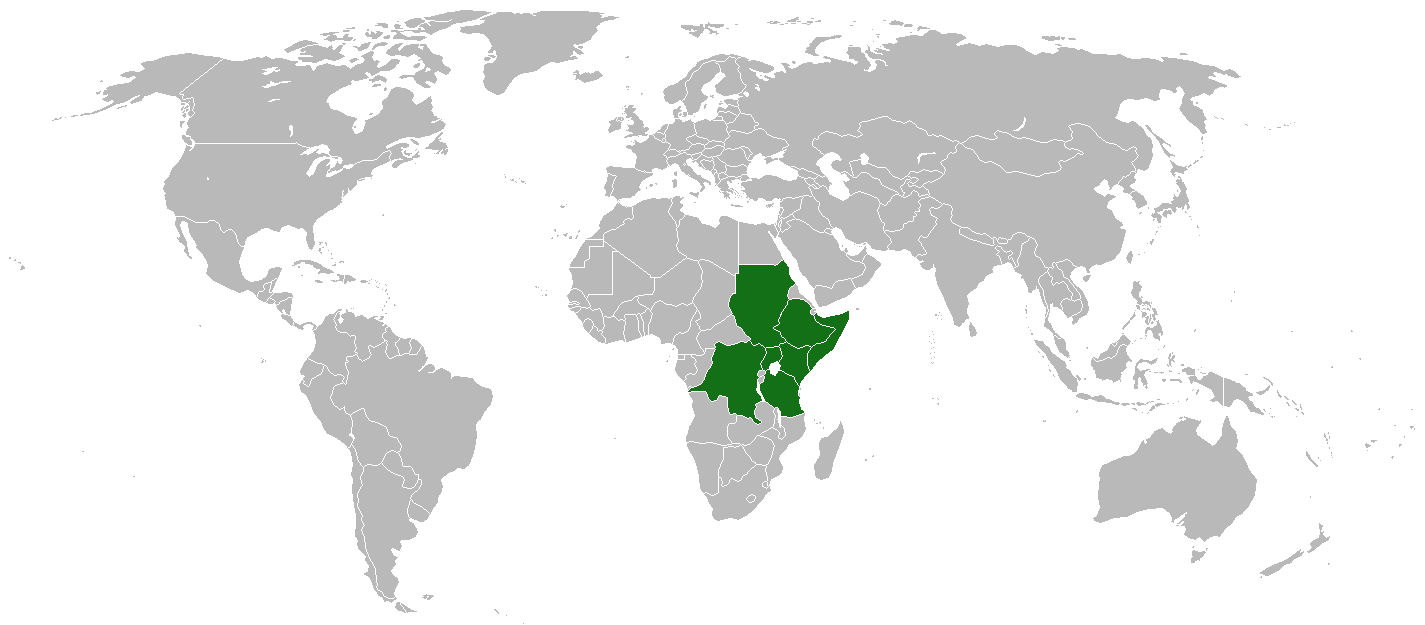

Synonyms
- Acacia drepanolobium Harms ex Sjöstedt

= Vachellia drepanolobium =

Whistling thorn

Species of legume

Vachellia drepanolobium, more commonly known as Acacia drepanolobium or whistling thorn, is a swollen-thorn acacia native to East Africa. The whistling thorn grows up to 6 meters tall. It produces a pair of straight spines at each node, some of which have large bulbous bases. These swollen spines are naturally hollow and occupied by any one of several symbiotic ant species. The common name of the plant is derived from the observation that when wind blows over bulbous spines in which ants have made entry and exit holes, they produce a whistling noise.

Whistling thorn is the dominant tree in some areas of upland East Africa, sometimes forming a nearly monoculture woodland, especially on "black cotton" soils of impeded drainage with high clay content. It is browsed upon by giraffes and other large herbivores. It is apparently fire-adapted, coppicing readily after "top kill" by fire.

Whistling thorn is used as fencing, tool handles, and other implements. The wood of the whistling thorn, although usually small in diameter, is hard and resistant to termites. The branches can also be used for kindling, and its gum is sometimes collected and used as glue. The ability to coppice after cutting make it a possibly sustainable source for fuel wood and charcoal. Conversely, whistling thorn also has been considered a weed of rangelands, and a woody plant encroachment species.

== Symbiosis with ants ==
Like other acacias, whistling thorns have leaves that contain tannins, which are thought to serve as deterrents to herbivory. Like all African acacias, they are defended by spines. In addition, whistling thorn acacias are myrmecophytes that have formed a mutualistic relationship with some species of acacia ants. In exchange for shelter in the bulbous spines (domatia) and nectar secretions, these ants appear to defend the tree against herbivores, such as elephants and giraffes, as well as herbivorous insects.

At a site in Kenya, three Crematogaster and one Tetraponera ant species compete for exclusive possession of individual whistling thorn trees: Crematogaster mimosae, C. sjostedti, C. nigriceps, and Tetraponera penzigi. Ant species vary in their level of mutualism with whistling thorn trees. The most common ant symbiote (~ 50% of trees), C. mimosae, has the strongest mutualistic relationship, aggressively defending trees from herbivores while relying on swollen-spines for shelter and feeding from nectar produced by glands near the base of leaves. (See also: Crematogaster peringueyi.)

3-Octanone and 3-Octanol have been identified as the alarm pheromones of Crematogaster negriceps and C. mimosa used in defending their tree. These chemicals are components of the ant's mandibular gland secretion. Later analysis of the mandibular gland secretion of these ants and of C. sjostedti showed distinct differences in the 28 volatile compounds that were identified.

Because the ants compete for exclusive usage of a given tree, some species employ tactics to reduce the chance of a hostile ant invasion. Crematogaster nigriceps ants trim the buds of trees to reduce their lateral growth, thereby reducing chances of contact with a neighbouring tree occupied by a rival colony. Tetraponera penzigi, the only species which does not utilise the nectar produced by the trees, instead destroys the nectar glands to make a tree less appealing to other species.

The symbiotic relationship between the trees and the ants appears to be maintained by the effects of browsing by large herbivores. At the site in Kenya, when large herbivores were experimentally excluded, trees reduced the number of nectar glands and swollen spines they provided to ants. In response, the usually dominant C. mimosae increased their tending of parasitic sap-sucking insects as a replacement food source. In addition, the number of C. mimosae-occupied trees declined while twice as many become occupied by C. sjostedti, a much less aggressive defender of trees. Because C. sjostedti benefits from the holes made by boring beetle larvae, this species facilitates parasitism of trees by the beetles. As a result, the mutualistic relationship between whistling thorn trees and resident ants breaks down in the absence of large herbivores, and trees become paradoxically less healthy as a result, and become much more vulnerable should herbivores be reintroduced.

== Gallery ==
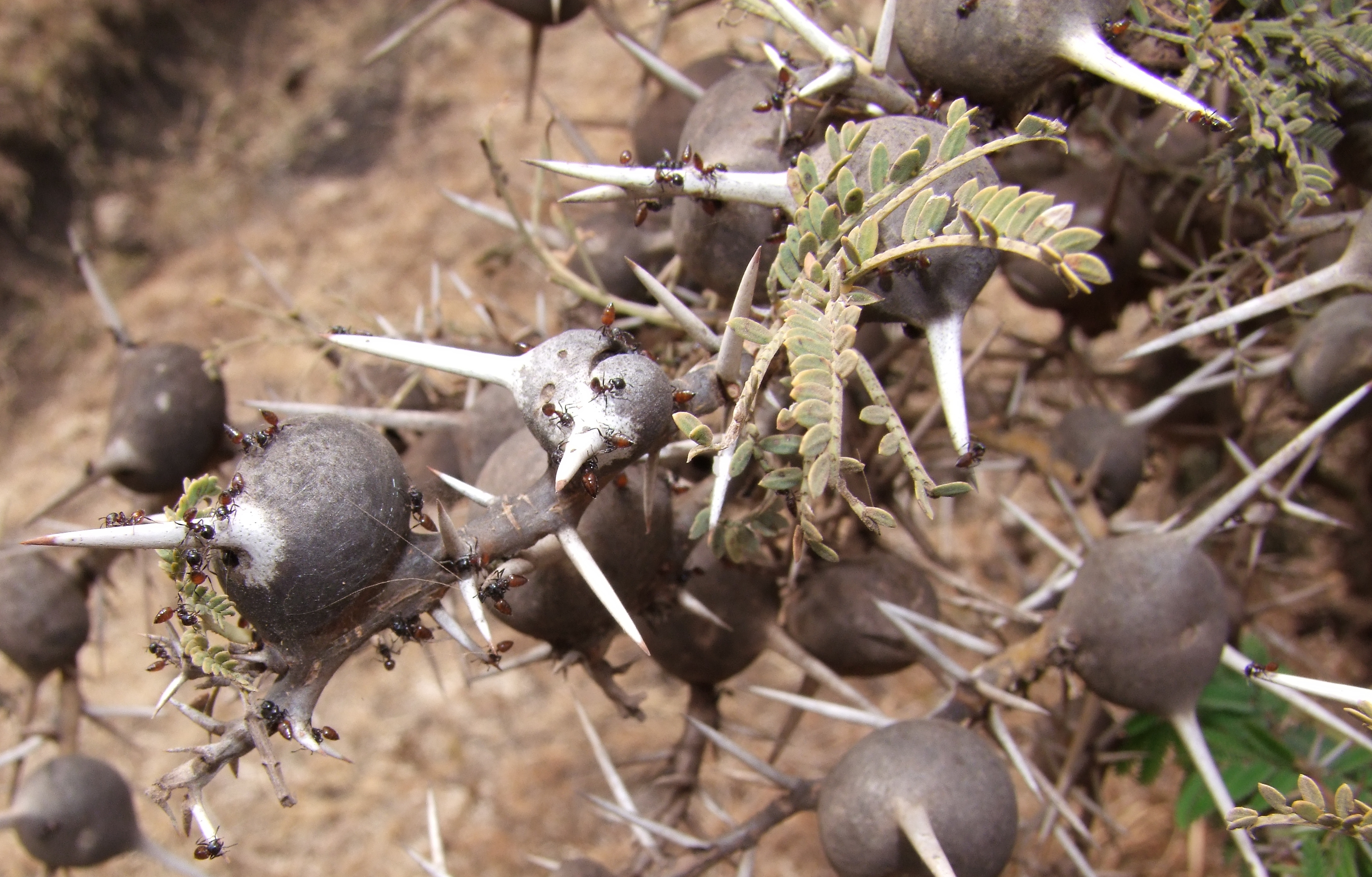
Crematogaster nigriceps ants in defensive demeanor. Note the absence of leaves except at the swollen thorns.

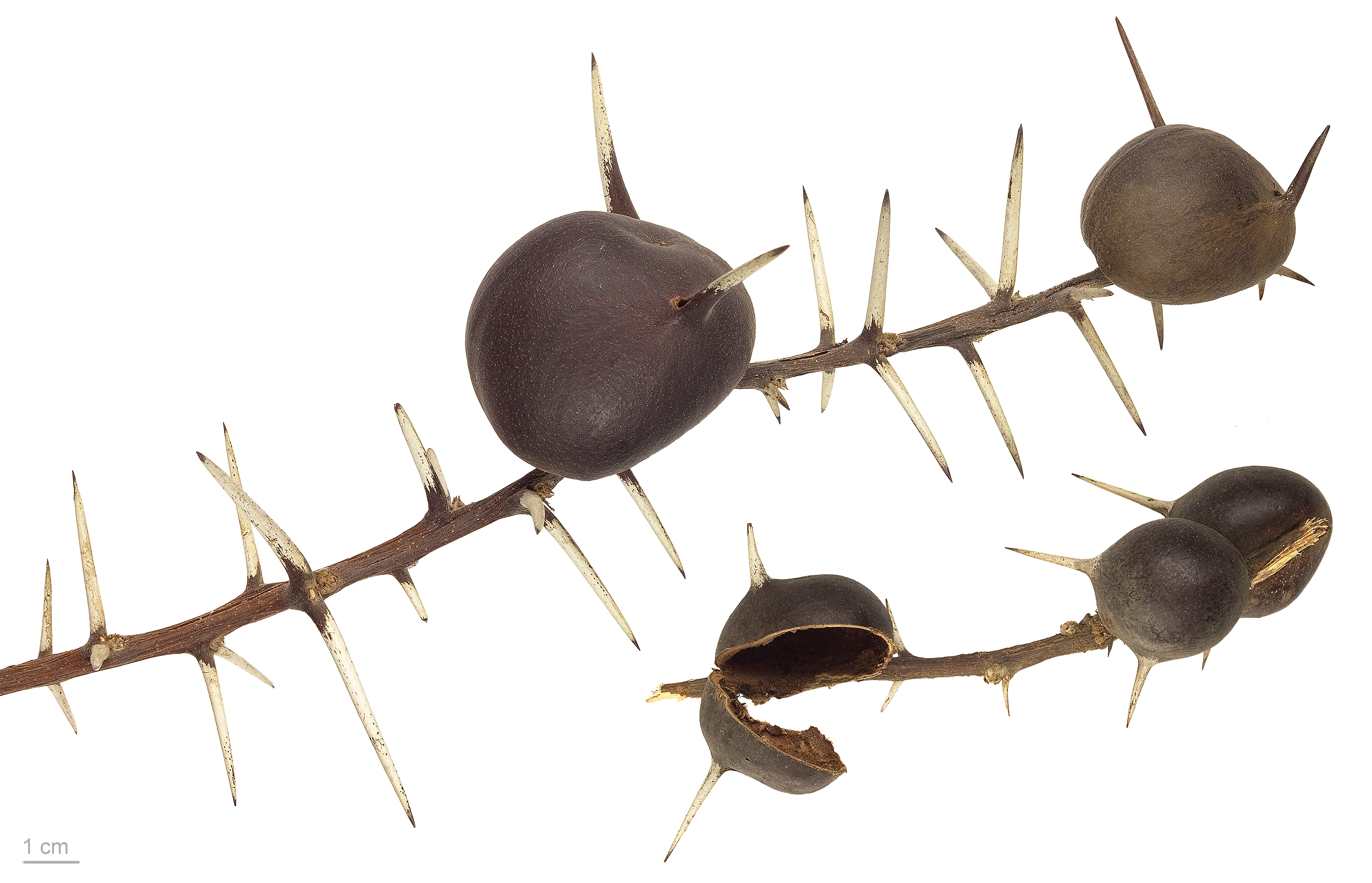
Vachellia (Acacia) drepanolobium - MHNT

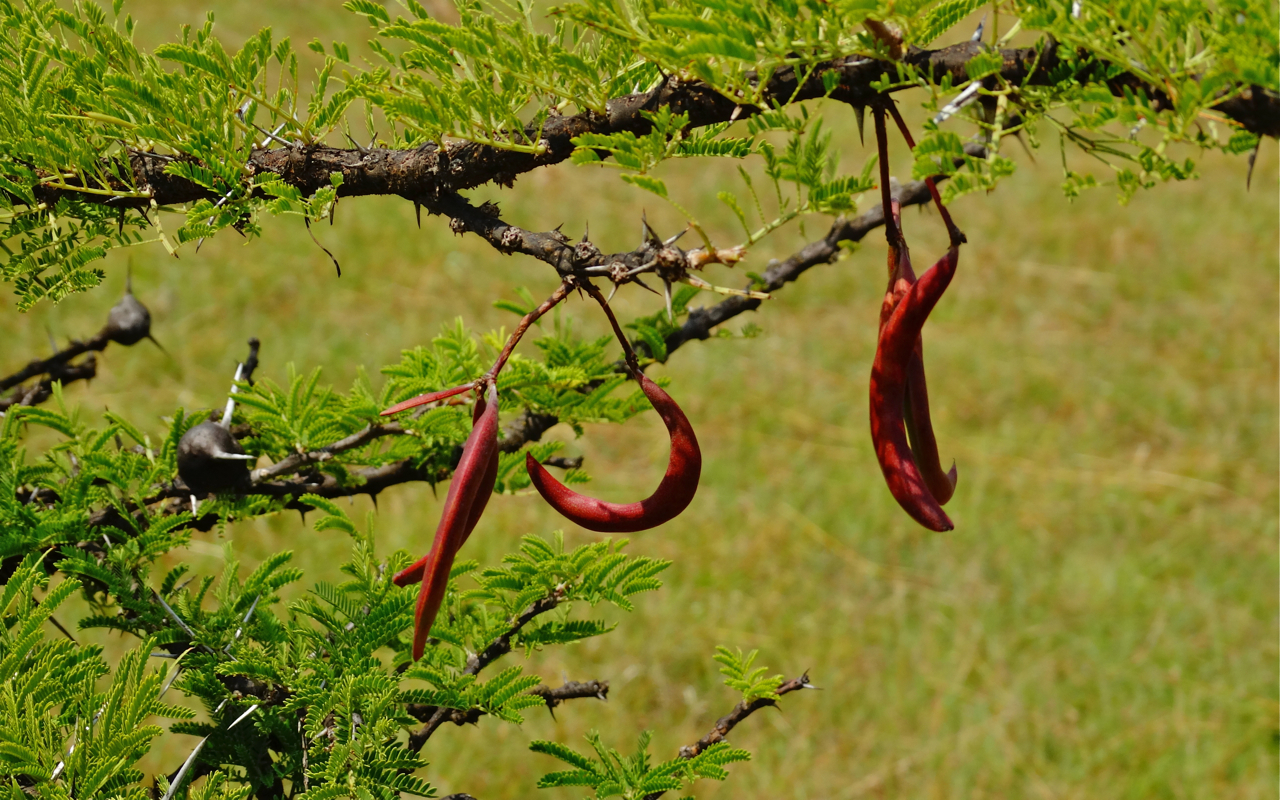
Vachellia (Acacia) drepanolobium seed pods.

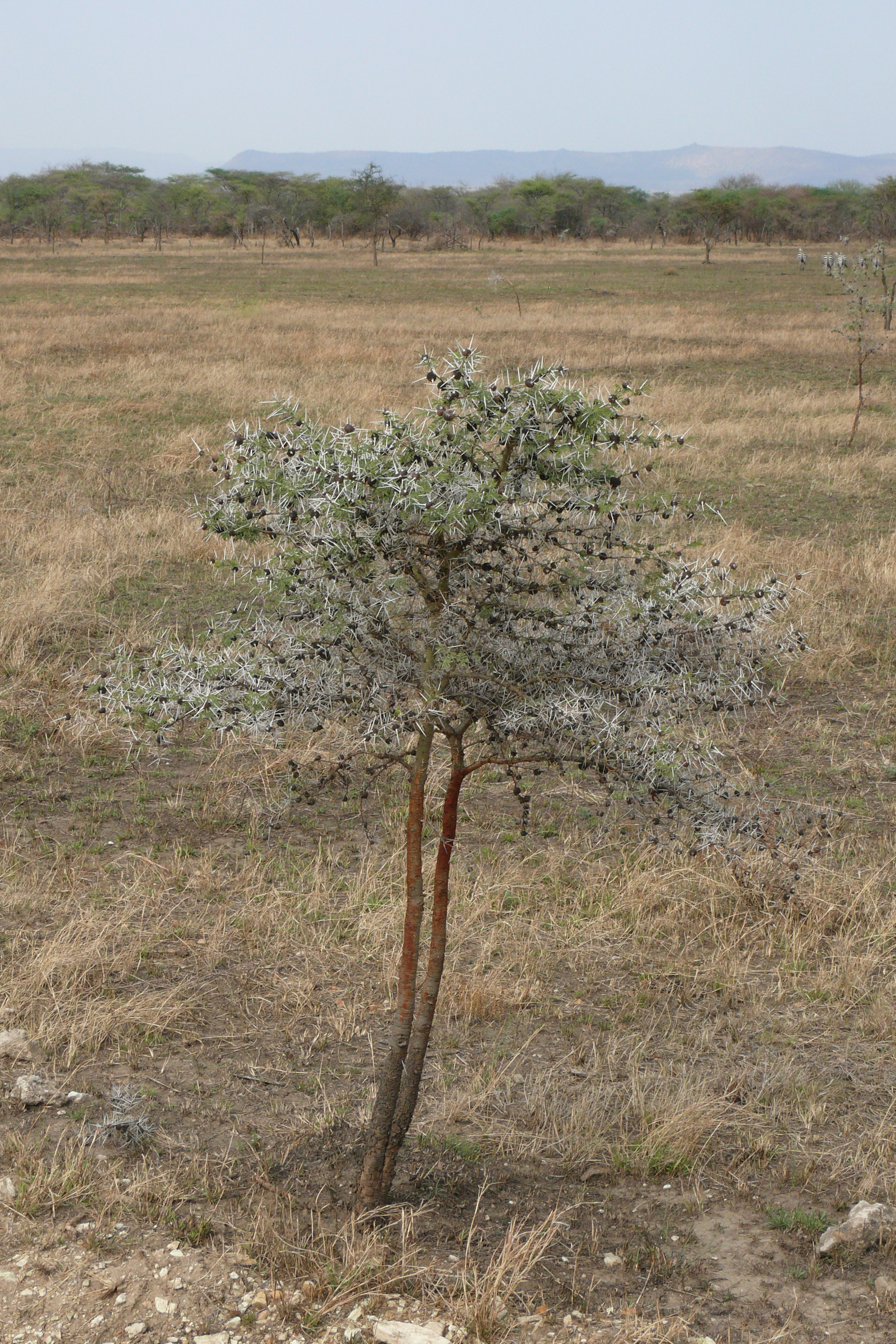
Vachellia (Acacia) drepanolobium.

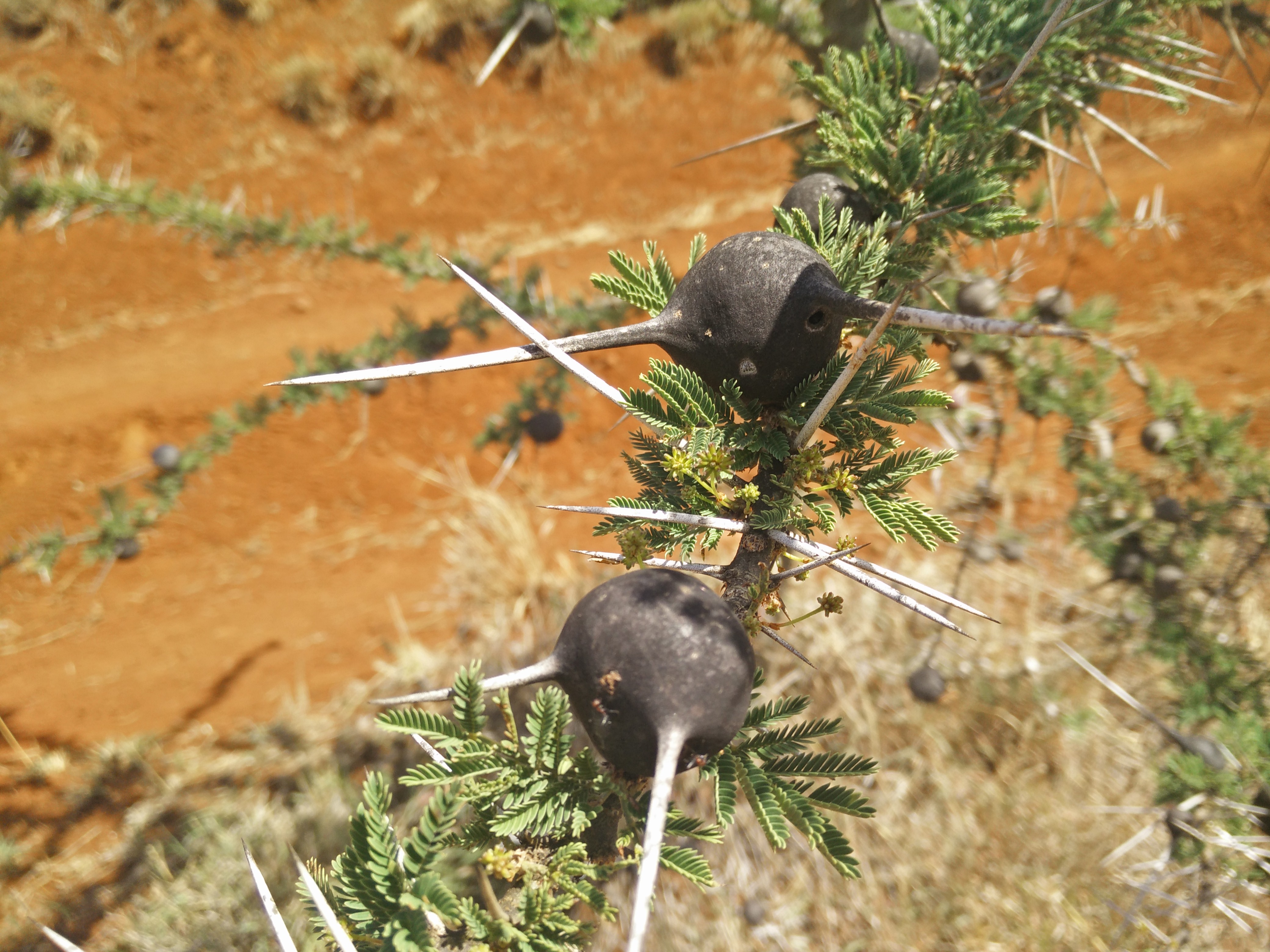
Vachellia (Acacia) drepanolobium growing in red volcanic soil on western slopes of Mount Kilimanjaro
