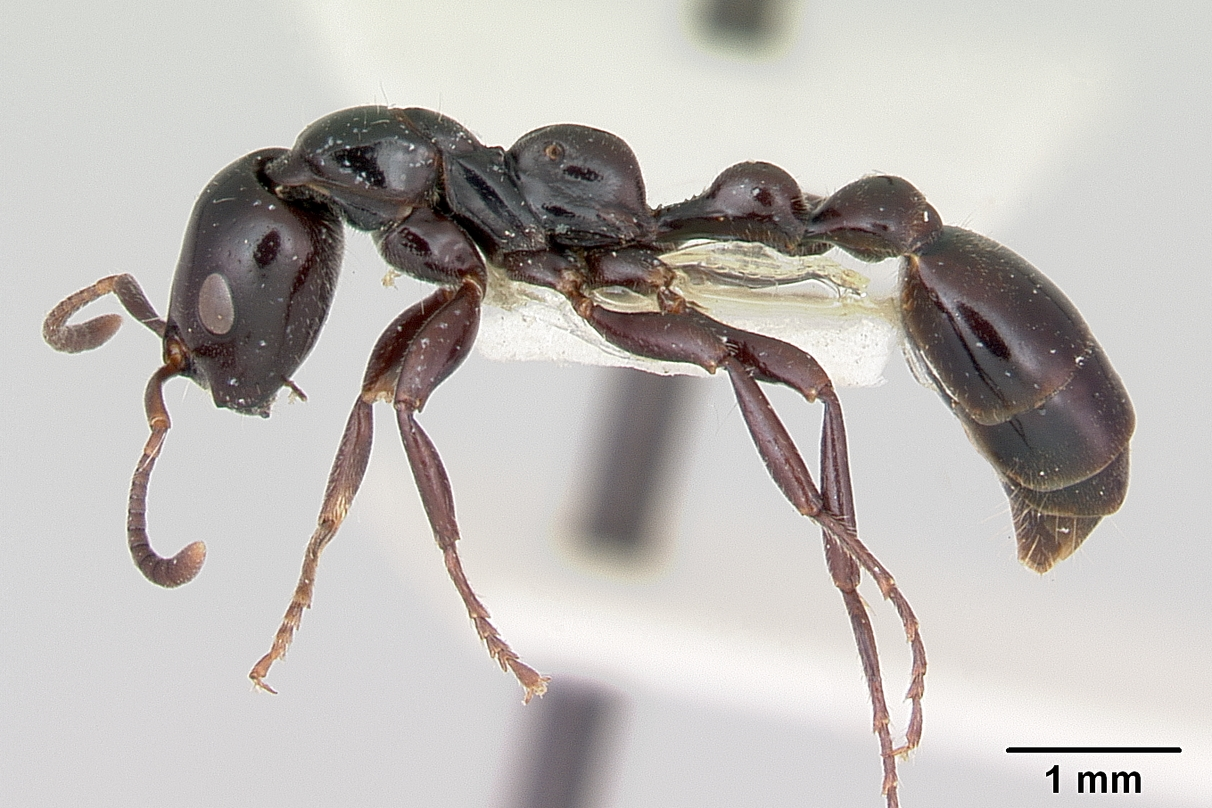
- T. nigra worker

Scientific classification
- Kingdom: Animalia
- Phylum: Arthropoda
- Clade: Pancrustacea
- Class: Insecta
- Order: Hymenoptera
- Family: Formicidae
- Genus: Tetraponera
- Species: T. nigra

Binomial name
- Tetraponera nigra (Jerdon, 1851)

Synonyms
- Tetraponera atrata

= Tetraponera nigra =

Species of ant

Tetraponera nigra is a species of ant of the subfamily Myrmicinae, which can be found in Borneo, Philippines, Bangladesh, India, Sri Lanka, Thailand, and China.
