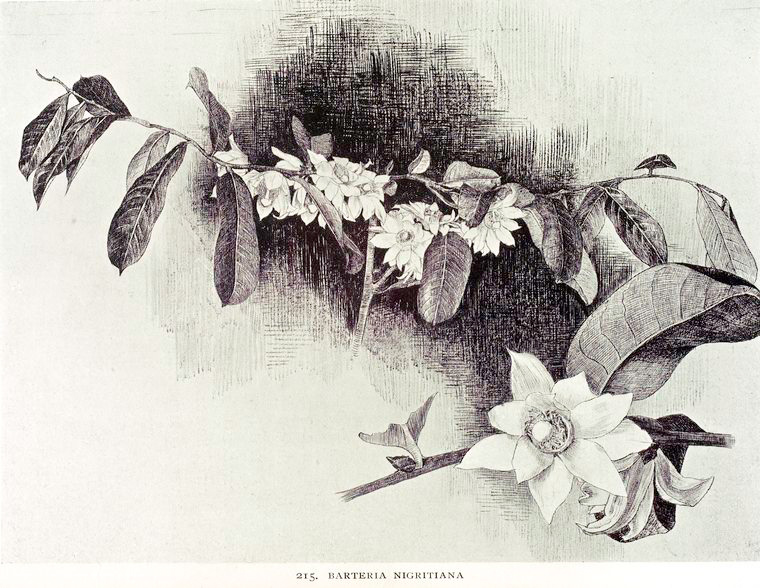
- Illustration of Barteria nigritana from 1906 by Matilda Smith

Scientific classification
- Kingdom: Plantae
- Clade: Tracheophytes
- Clade: Angiosperms
- Clade: Eudicots
- Clade: Rosids
- Order: Malpighiales
- Family: Passifloraceae
- Subfamily: Passifloroideae
- Tribe: Paropsieae
- Genus: Barteria; Hook.f.

Synonyms
- Buelowia Schumach.; Smeathmannia R.Br.

= Barteria =

Genus of flowering plants

The genus Barteria is in the family Passifloraceae in the major group angiosperms (flowering plants). It contains 8 described species, however, only 6 are accepted.

They are native to Tropical Africa and found in the countries of Angola, Benin, Burkina, Cabinda, Cameroon, Central African Republic, Chad, Congo, Equatorial Guinea, Gabon, Gambia, Ghana, Guinea, Guinea-Bissau, Gulf of Guinea Island, Ivory Coast, Liberia, Mali, Nigeria, Senegal, Sierra Leone, Tanzania, Uganda and Zaïre.

== Accepted species ==
- Barteria dewevrei De Wild. & T.Durand
- Barteria fistulosa Mast.
- Barteria laevigata (Sol. ex R.Br.) Byng & Christenh.
- Barteria nigritana Hook.f.
- Barteria pubescens (Sol. ex R.Br.) Byng & Christenh.
- Barteria solida Breteler

== Taxonomy ==
The genus name of Barteria is in honour of Charles Barter (1821 – 1859), was a Scottish gardener and botanist who trained at Kew Gardens in London from 1849 to 1851. It was first described and published in J. Proc. Linn. Soc., Bot. Vol.5 on page 14 in 1860.
