= Vitex thyrsiflora =

Conservation status
- Least Concern (IUCN 3.1)

Scientific classification
- Kingdom: Plantae
- Clade: Embryophytes
- Clade: Tracheophytes
- Clade: Spermatophytes
- Clade: Angiosperms
- Clade: Eudicots
- Clade: Asterids
- Order: Lamiales
- Family: Lamiaceae
- Genus: Vitex
- Species: V. thyrsiflora

Binomial name
- Vitex thyrsiflora Baker

Synonyms
- Vitex agraria A.Chev.; Vitex myrmecophila Mildbr.; Vitex obanensis Wernham; Vitex staudtii Gürke

Species of tree

Vitex thyrsiflora is a species of woody vine in the family Lamiaceae. It is native to tropical West and Central Africa. Its hollow stem is used as a home by an aggressive species of ant.

== Description ==
Although many species of Vitex are tall forest trees, Vitex thyrsiflora is a liana, climbing over other trees. It is recognisable by the opposite pairs of palmately compound leaves, with clusters of tiny, lipped, flowers in the leaf axils.

== Distribution ==
Vitex thyrsiflora grows in the rain forests of tropical West and Central Africa, its range extending from Guinea and Ivory Coast, through Ghana, Nigeria and Cameroon to the Central African Republic and the Democratic Republic of the Congo.

== Ecology ==
Vitex thyrsiflora has hollow twigs and branches and ants use these as their domatia (specialised chambers adapted for habitation by ants). In young lianas, several species of ant compete for the use of these domatia, but in older individuals, the aggressive ant Tetraponera tessmanni establishes dominance over the other species and is the only ant occupant. Apart from patrolling the liana's leaves and attacking herbivorous insects that land on them, all the ants' activities take place in the interior of the liana.

== Uses ==
An extract of the leaves of Vitex thyrsiflora have been used in traditional medicine in the treatment of orchitis, infertility, parasitic infections and stomach pains. Research shows that an ethanol extract contains alkaloids, flavonoids, steroids, and glycosides, and has antioxidant, anti-inflammatory, analgesic, and antipyretic effects.

In 2016, a dichloromethane extract from the bark of the trunk was reported to show antiplasmodial activity in vitro.

== Status ==
The International Union for Conservation of Nature has rated the conservation status of this liana as being of "least concern". This is on the basis that it has a wide range and a large population, and faces no particular threats.
