= Tetraponera penzigi =

Scientific classification
- Kingdom: Animalia
- Phylum: Arthropoda
- Clade: Pancrustacea
- Class: Insecta
- Order: Hymenoptera
- Family: Formicidae
- Genus: Tetraponera
- Species: T. penzigi

Binomial name
- Tetraponera penzigi (Mayr, 1907)

Species of ant

Tetraponera penzigi is a species of ant of the subfamily Pseudomyrmecinae, which can be found in East Africa. It forms an obligate symbiosis with the whistling thorn acacia (Vachellia drepanolobium), a dominant tree in some upland areas of East Africa.

== Description ==
A worker of T. penzigi is typically 3.1 to 4.5 mm (0.12 to 0.18 in) in length and is black with light brown appendages.

== Distribution ==
Tetraponera penzigi is native to Kenya, Uganda and Tanzania.

== Ecology ==
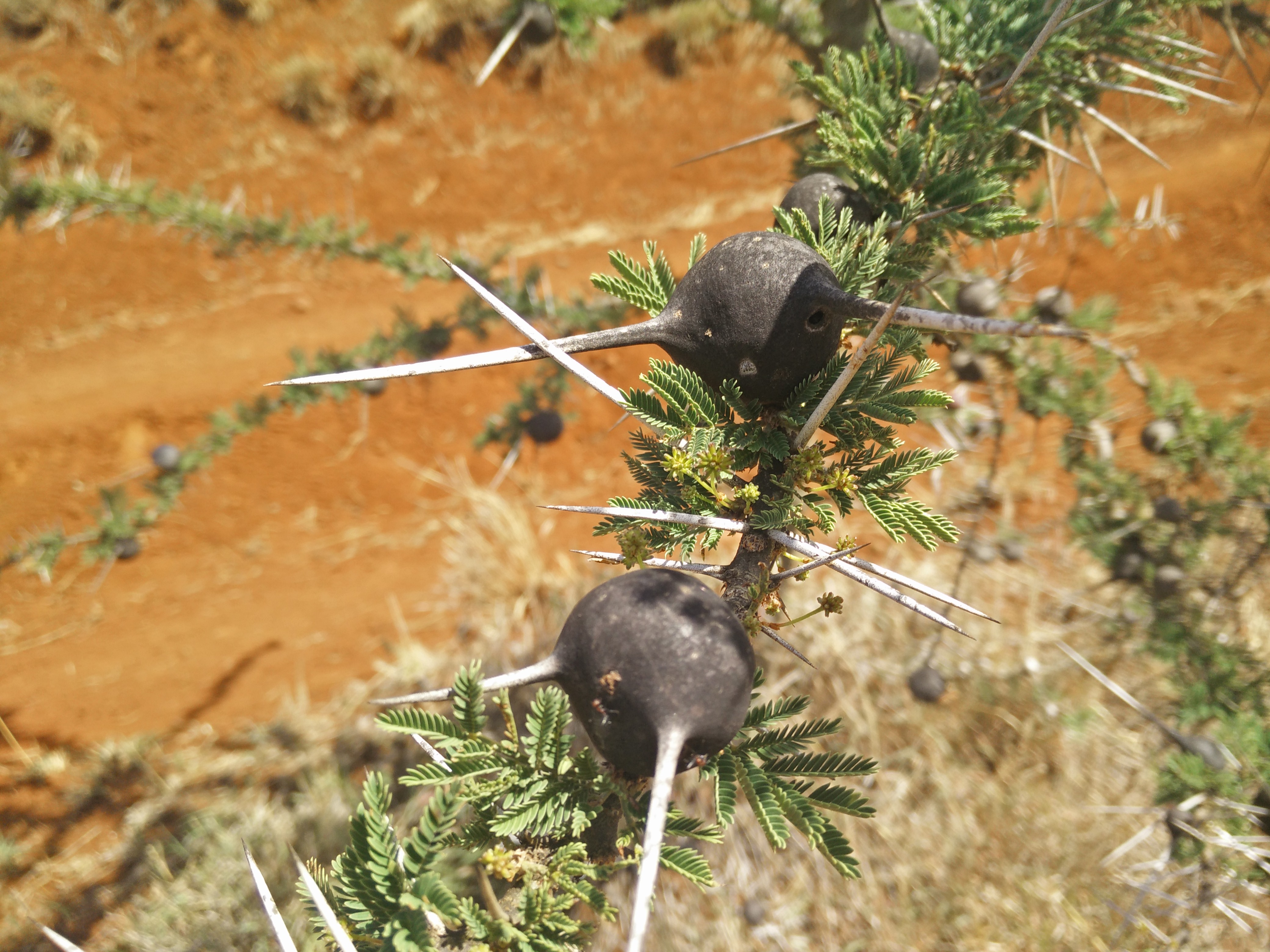
Whistling thorn showing swollen thorn bases used by ants as domatia

The whistling thorn produces a pair of straight spines at each node, and some of these have grossly swollen, hollow bases which are used by ants as domatia. Four species of symbiotic ant use V. drepanolobium as host; these are T. penzigi and three different species of Crematogaster. The ants are mutually exclusive, only one species normally occupying a host tree at any one time. T. penzigi is often the first ant to colonise young trees, being attracted by the nectar provided by extrafloral nectaries that the tree supplies. As the tree grows, T. penzigi ants tend to be evicted by Crematogaster ants, which do not feed from the nectaries, and destroy them on trees occupied by T. penzigi, but not on other trees. The tree benefits from the presence of the ants because they are aggressive, streaming out of their domitia when disturbed and attacking grazing animals such as giraffes and rhinoceroses; having learned this, the mammals are deterred in their grazing activities.

The major mandibular gland chemicals identified from the heads of T. penzigi are 3-octanone and 2-phenylethanol. Like other ant mandibular secretion these may act as ant alarm pheromones. 3-Octanone is also found as part of the alarm pheromone mixture of Crematogaster ants that are also symbionts on the whistling thorn acacia in Kenya.

The introduction of the bigheaded ant Pheidole megacephala in Laikipia County, Kenya, has disrupted the mutualism between acacia trees and ants. Crematogaster ants actively defended the whistling thorn against the bigheaded ants and were all extirpated from the tree. However, T. penzigi workers, when present, retreated into their domitia and co-existed with the invaders for more than thirty days. The absence of the fierce Crematogaster ants resulted in the tree being much more likely to be grazed and damaged by elephants.
