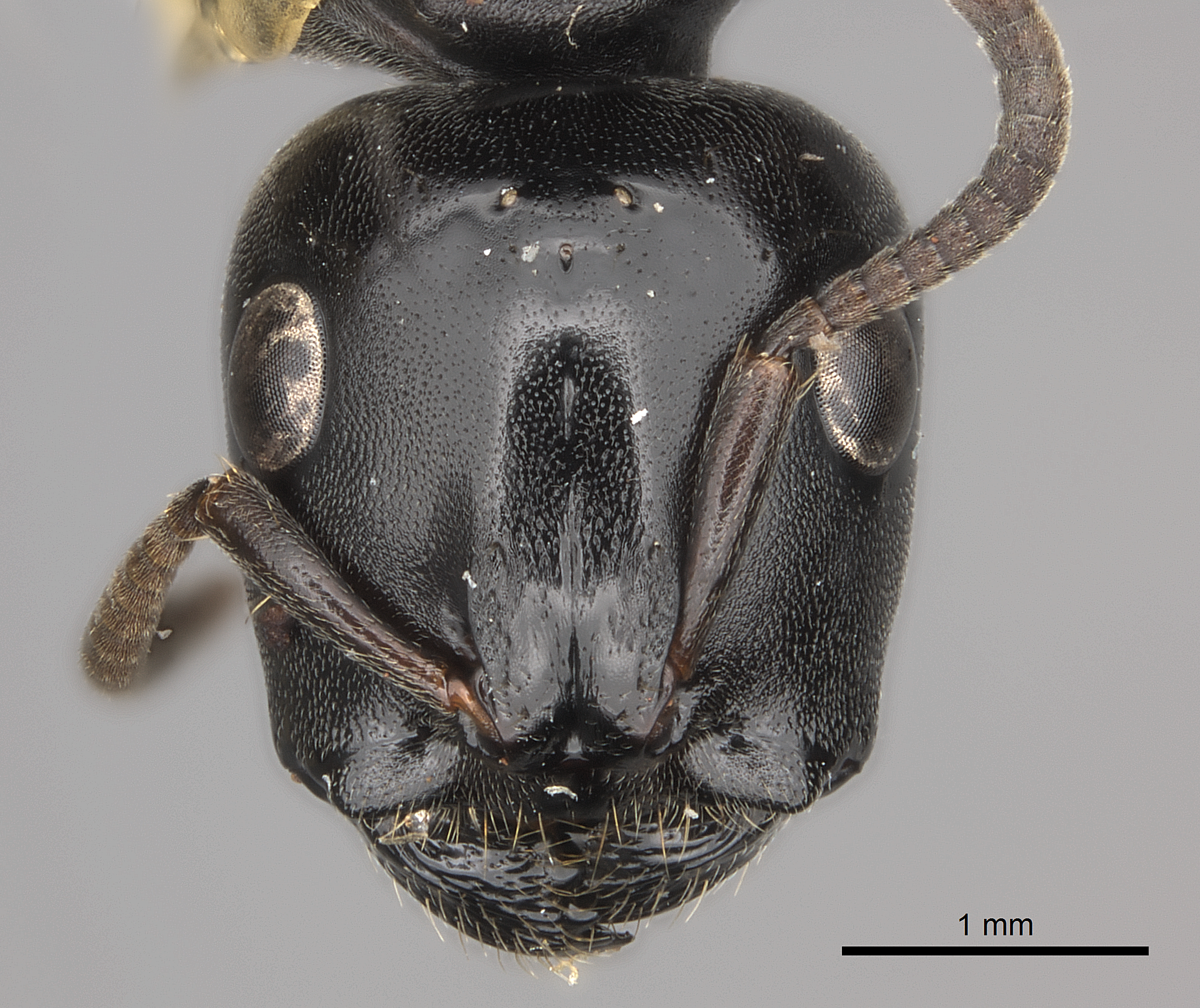
- Tetraponera aethiops, head

Scientific classification
- Kingdom: Animalia
- Phylum: Arthropoda
- Clade: Pancrustacea
- Class: Insecta
- Order: Hymenoptera
- Family: Formicidae
- Subfamily: Pseudomyrmecinae
- Tribe: Pseudomyrmecini
- Genus: Tetraponera
- Species: T. aethiops

Binomial name
- Tetraponera aethiops Smith, 1877

= Tetraponera aethiops =

Species of ant

Tetraponera aethiops is a species of ant in the subfamily Pseudomyrmecinae, which is native to tropical Africa. It is found living in the forest in association with Barteria fistulosa, a small tree.

== Distribution and habitat ==
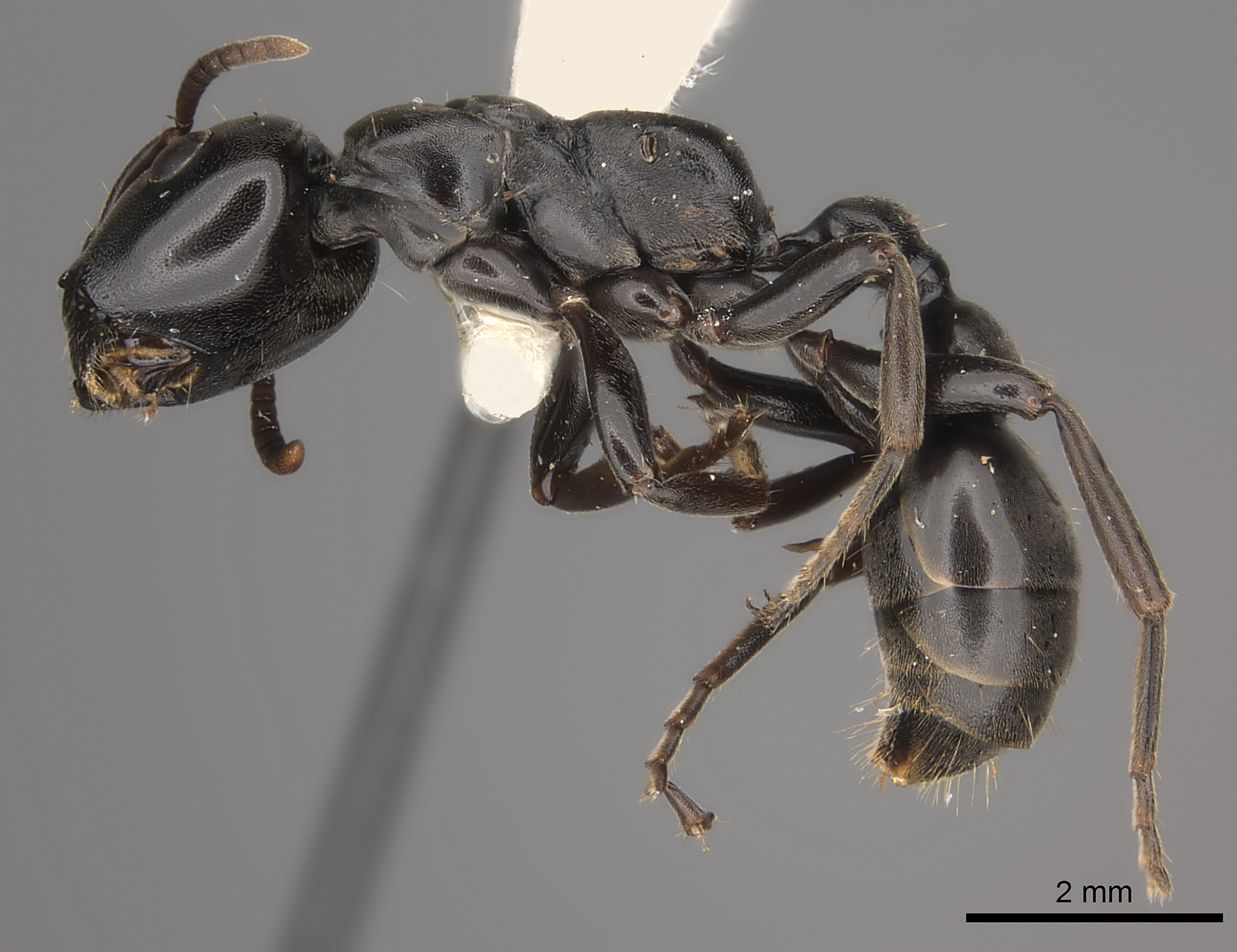
Profile

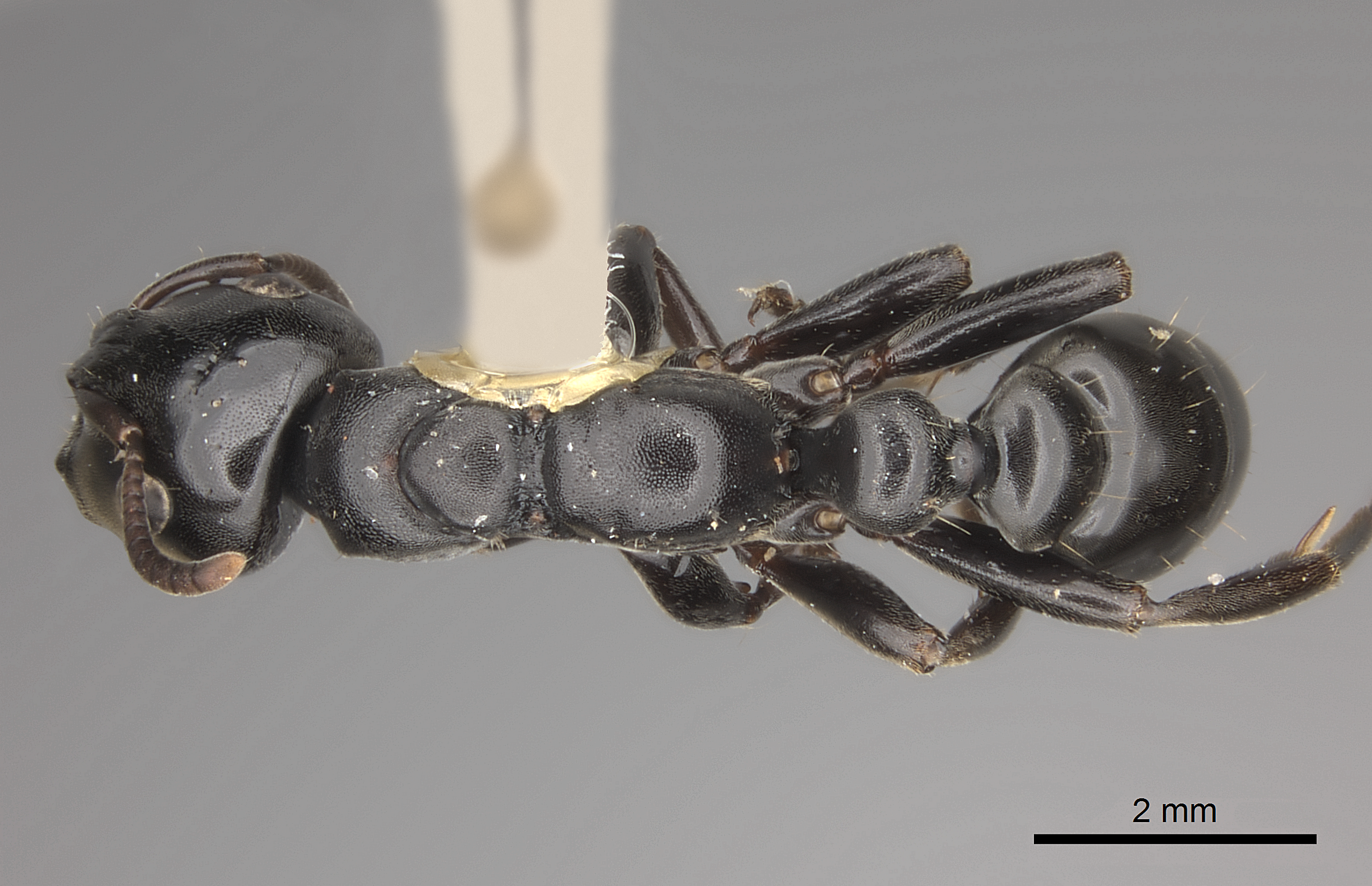
Dorsal view

This ant is always found living in association with the tree Barteria fistulosa, so the ant is only found where the tree grows in Central Africa. Its range extends from Nigeria, through Cameroon and the Central African Republic to the Democratic Republic of Congo. The tree grows in moist mixed terra firma forest where it forms part of the understory.

== Ecology ==
After her nuptial flight, a queen Tetraponera aethiops searches for a Barteria fistulosa tree. The branches are hollow and she chooses a shoot some 10 to 20 cm (4 to 8 in) long and chews a hole through which she enters the cavity, known as a domitia. This links up to other parts of the tree and already contains the resources she needs, scale insects and fungus, on which she feeds. As the shoot grows, the colony expands to fill the newly available space. The ants are aggressive and have a very painful sting. They protect the host tree from herbivorous insects that feed on leaves, and their presence on the tree give rise to its common name of "ant tree". The worker ants detect vibrations when an insect lands on a leaf blade, and rush out of their domitia to ambush it. A large insect may be stung by several ants, spread-eagled and cut in pieces; some ants may feed on the hemolymph while others may carry off bits of prey. Other victims like small caterpillars may be stung to kill them and discarded.
