= Barteria fistulosa =

Scientific classification
- Kingdom: Plantae
- Clade: Tracheophytes
- Clade: Angiosperms
- Clade: Eudicots
- Clade: Rosids
- Order: Malpighiales
- Family: Passifloraceae
- Genus: Barteria
- Species: B. fistulosa

Binomial name
- Barteria fistulosa Mast.

Species of tree

Barteria fistulosa is a species of tree in the family Passifloraceae, native to tropical Central Africa. The tree has an association with an aggressive species of ant with a very painful sting, which lives in its hollow branches and twigs, and gives rise to its common name of "ant tree".

== Description ==
Barteria fistulosa is a small evergreen tree growing to a height of about 13 m (40 ft). It has a deep taproot, multiple trunks and spreading horizontal branches which are hollow. The leaves alternate are simple, slightly overlapping and borne on short flattened stalks. The leaf blades are glossy green, oblong, and widest just beyond the mid-point, and have entire margins and a slight notch at the apex. The tiny, regular, white flowers form an arc of five flowers around the leaf bases and are followed by small globular fruits.

== Distribution and habitat ==
Barteria fistulosa can be found in tropical Central Africa, its range extending from Nigeria to the Democratic Republic of Congo. It grows in moist mixed terra firma forest, where it forms part of the understory. It is also found in gallery forests, secondary forests, glades and clearings. The seedlings can tolerate deep shade.

== Ecology ==
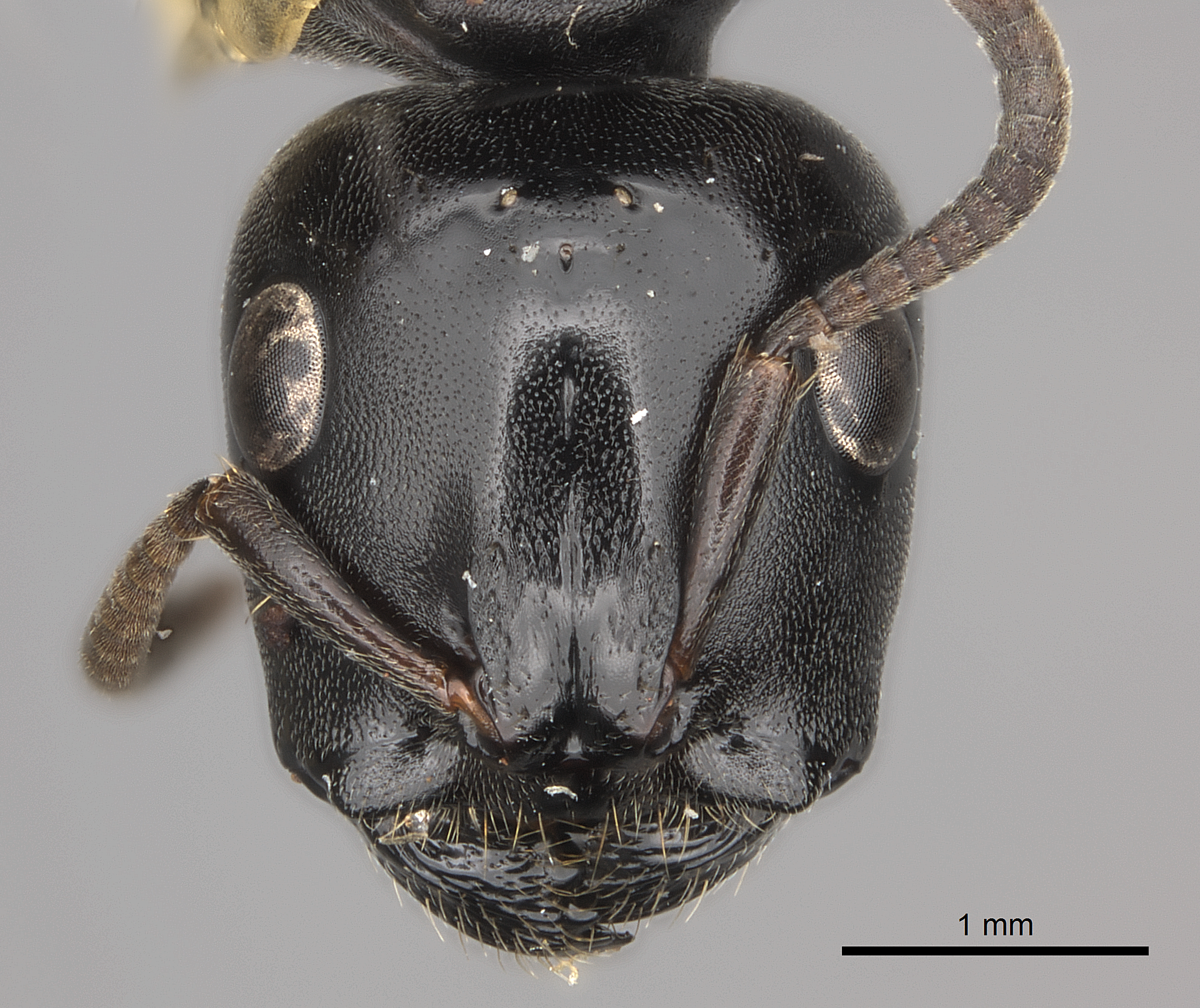
Tetraponera aethiops

Barteria fistulosa has a symbiotic relationship with the very aggressive ant Tetraponera aethiops, which makes its home in the hollow twigs and branches (known as domatia) and defends the tree against herbivores. This ant lives exclusively on B. fistulosa; each ant colony has a single queen and the ants feed on nectar produced by the tree in extra-floral nectaries, and on the honeydew produced by scale insects that they tend inside their domatia. Elephants like to feed on the foliage of this tree, but their trunks are likely to be very sensitive to attacks by the ant. As well as deterring herbivores, the ants remove pieces of debris from the surface of the leaves, carrying them to the edge of the blade before dropping them off.

== Uses ==
Several parts of this tree are used in traditional medicine; the roots, bark and leaves are used to reduce fevers and pains; a decoction of the bark has various uses and the sap helps with the healing of wounds; some parts of the tree are used against snake bites and epilepsy; and the young shoots are thought to have aphrodisiac properties.
