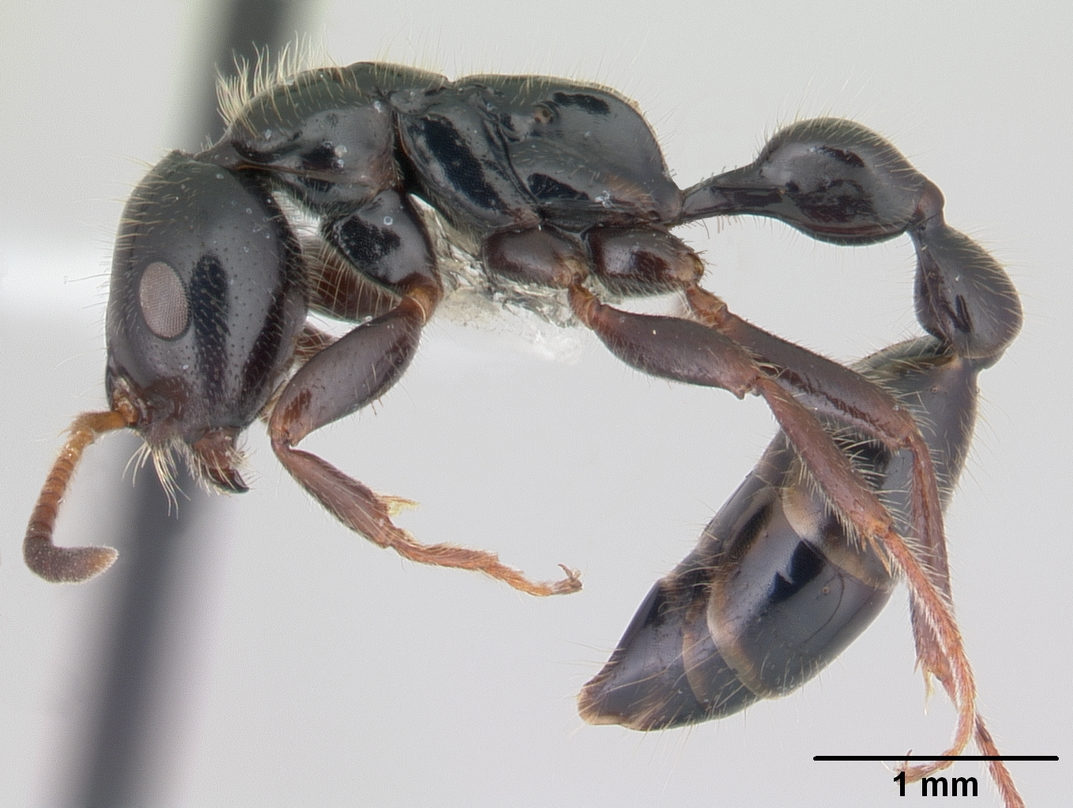
- Tetraponera rakotonis worker

Scientific classification
- Kingdom: Animalia
- Phylum: Arthropoda
- Class: Insecta
- Order: Hymenoptera
- Family: Formicidae
- Subfamily: Pseudomyrmecinae
- Tribe: Pseudomyrmecini
- Genus: Tetraponera; Smith, 1852

Type species
- Tetraponera nigra (as T. atrata) Smith, 1852

Diversity
- 96 species

= Tetraponera =

Genus of ants

Tetraponera is a genus of ants in the subfamily Pseudomyrmecinae that are commonly known as slender ants and are characterized by their arboreal nature and slender bodies. The 96 described species of Tetraponera all of which live in hollow structures of plants and trees, such as thorns or branches; these hosts are known as myrmecophytes. Tetraponera species are closely related to the New World genus of ants Pseudomyrmex, but differ in their relationships with host plants.

== Mutualisms and behaviour ==
Tetraponera species are generally defined by the myrmecophytes they inhabit and the mutualistic relationship they share. These host plants always have hollow thorns or branches in which the ants can live and form a colony. Also, the myrmecophytes provide energy rich food sources such as extrafloral nectar and/or food bodies. All Tetraponera species have gut symbionts that allow them to digest amino acid-deficient food provided by their host plants; these gut bacteria are especially important for the species that only survive on the myrmecophyte-provided foods.

All Tetraponera species provide protection for their host plants through aggressive nature towards other insects and trimming leaves/branches of neighbouring plants. Living in hollow structures of the plants allows the ants to detect vibrations when larger insects land on the plant, or workers on patrol visually detect smaller intruders. Once detected, sophisticated pheromone systems allow the ants to quickly outnumber and overpower any invaders. Most insect invaders are killed and discarded by Tetraponera workers such as caterpillars and aphids, but some are killed and consumed. The insects that take the most time and effort to kill are generally consumed; these are mostly katydids or leaf beetles.

As well as assaulting and killing insects that attack their host plant, Tetraponera ants will attack any mammals that present a threat. Inflicting the mammals with painful stings will usually deter them from attacking the plant.

In some arboreal ant species, not just Tetraponera, a third partner in ant-myrmecophyte mutualisms is hemipteran trophobionts. These insects provide a possible third source of food for the ants, in return the ants feed and “nurture” the Hemiptera inside their colonies.

== Distribution ==
Tetraponera species are found commonly in the warmer regions of Africa, Asia, and Australia. Different species are associated with different plant species. The most common myrmecophytes for Tetraponera are acacias, but the wide variety of hosts for this genus include bamboos and lianas. Tetraponera ants trim neighbouring plants to prevent any intrusion of other ants or caterpillars from those plants and to reduce resource competition for their host. Tetraponera species only leave their myrmecophyte to start a new colony on a different host; a queen and a number of workers leave the old host plant to allow the colony to continue to expand.

== Lifecycle and castes ==
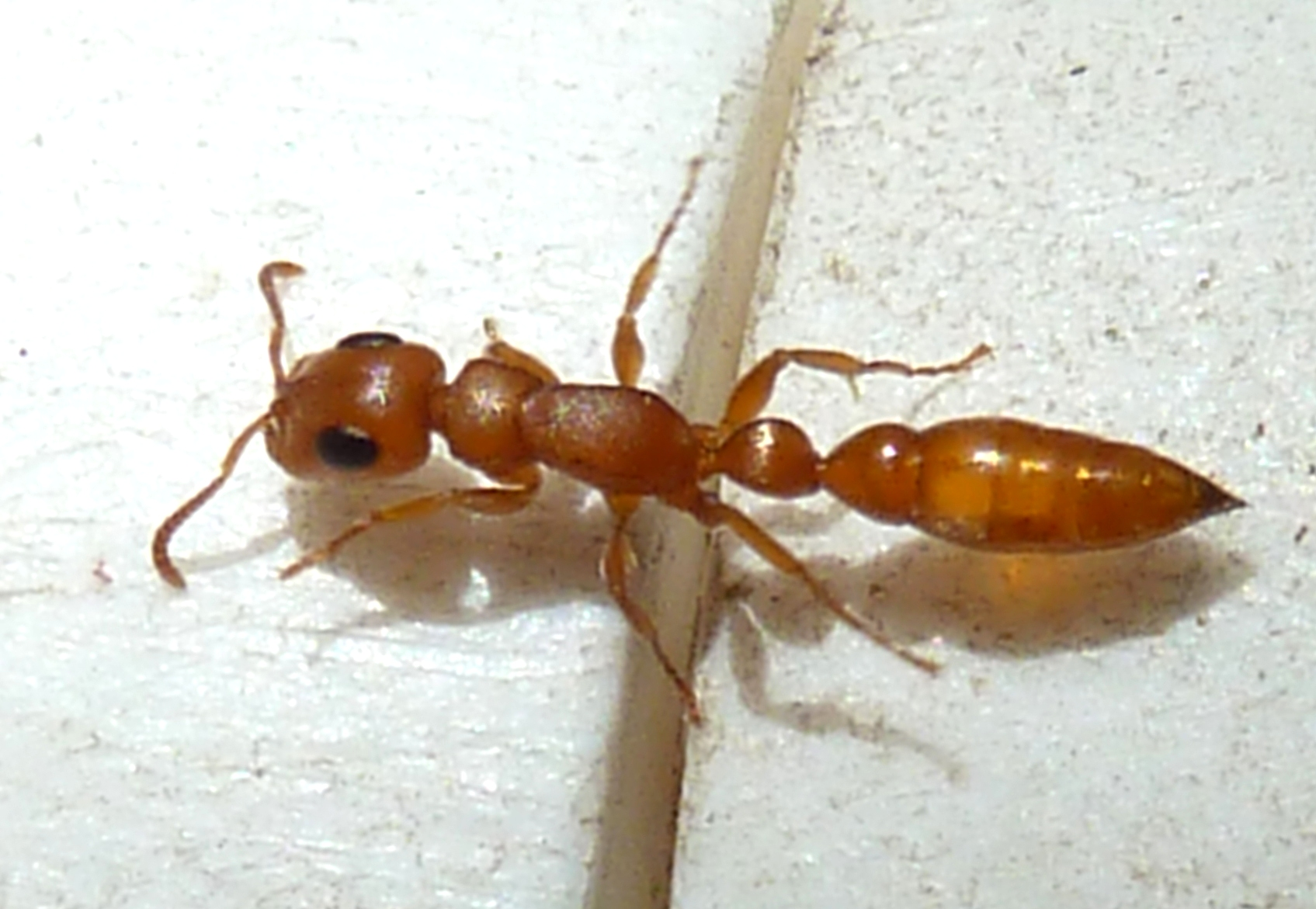
A slender ant worker

Tetraponera, like most ants, has one or a few queens that are the only females to reproduce in a colony. The sterile workers are all females that forage for food and defend the colony. Males are produced only during certain times of the year and disperse to mate with virgins queens from other colonies. Since ants are haplodiploid, they can control what sex their offspring will be; an unfertilised egg will become a male, while a fertilised egg will be female. This reliably restricts the production of male alates to the species' mating season, when the winged virgin queens and males fly from their home colonies to mate and start new colonies.

The eggs produced by the queen hatch into larvae which are cared for inside the colony, protected from any predators by the workers. The amount of care each female larva receives determines its fate as a worker or a new queen; all males are drones. When a new colony is formed, eggs are initially produced at a low rate, but this quickly increases in the second to fourth years, to ensure enough workers are produced to protect and provide for the growing colony.

== Species ==
- T. aethiops Smith, 1877
- T. aitkenii (Forel, 1902)
- T. allaborans (Walker, 1859)
- T. amargina Xu & Chai, 2004
- T. ambigua (Emery, 1895)
- T. andrei (Mayr, 1895)
- T. anthracina (Santschi, 1910)
- T. apiculata Ward, 2001
- T. atra Donisthorpe, 1949
- T. attenuata Smith, 1877
- T. avia Ward, 2001
- T. bifoveolata (Mayr, 1895)
- T. binghami (Forel, 1902)
- T. bita Ward, 2001
- T. brevis Ward, 2001
- T. buops Ward, 2001
- T. caffra (Santschi, 1914)
- T. clypeata (Emery, 1886)
- T. concava Xu & Chai, 2004
- T. conica Ward, 2001
- T. connectens Ward, 2001
- T. continua (Forel, 1907)
- T. convexa Xu & Chai, 2004
- T. cortina Ward, 2022
- T. crassiuscula (Emery, 1900)
- T. diana (Santschi, 1911)
- T. difficilis (Emery, 1900)
- T. dispar Ward, 2022
- T. elegans Ward, 2022
- T. emeryi (Forel, 1911)
- T. erythraea (Emery, 1895)
- †T. europaea Dlussky, 2009
- T. exactor Ward, 2022
- T. exasciata (Forel, 1892)
- T. extenuata Ward, 2001
- T. fictrix (Forel, 1897)
- T. furcata Xu & Chai, 2004
- T. furtiva Ward, 2022
- T. gerdae (Stitz, 1911)
- T. grandidieri (Forel, 1891)
- †T. groehni Dlussky, 2009
- T. hespera Ward, 2009
- T. hirsuta Ward, 2009
- T. hysterica (Forel, 1892)
- T. inermis Ward, 2009
- T. inversinodis Ward, 2001
- †T. klebsi (Wheeler, 1915)
- T. kosi Ward, 2022
- †T. lacrimarum (Wheeler, 1915)
- T. laeviceps (Smith, 1859)
- T. latifrons (Emery, 1912)
- T. liengmei (Forel, 1894)
- T. longula (Emery, 1895)
- T. manangotra Ward, 2009
- T. mandibularis (Emery, 1895)
- T. mayri (Forel, 1901)
- T. merita Ward, 2009
- T. microcarpa Wu & Wang, 1990
- T. mimula Ward, 2001
- T. mocquerysi (André, 1890)
- T. modesta (Smith, 1860)
- T. morondaviensis (Forel, 1891)
- T. natalensis (Smith, 1858)
- T. nigra (Jerdon, 1851)
- T. nitida (Smith, 1860)
- T. nixa Ward, 2001
- T. nodosa Ward, 2001
- T. notabilis Ward, 2001
- †T. ocellata (Mayr, 1868)
- †T. oligocenica (Théobald, 1937)
- T. ophtalmica (Emery, 1912)
- T. parops Ward, 2006
- T. pedana Ward, 2022
- T. penzigi (Mayr, 1907)
- T. periyarensis Bharti & Akbar, 2014
- T. perlonga Santschi, 1928
- T. phragmatica Ward, 2006
- T. pilosa (Smith, 1858)
- T. polita Ward, 2001
- T. protensa Xu & Chai, 2004
- T. pumila Ward, 2022
- T. punctulata Smith, 1877
- T. rakotonis (Forel, 1891)
- T. redacta Ward, 2022
- T. rotula Ward, 2001
- T. rufonigra (Jerdon, 1851)
- T. sahlbergii (Forel, 1887)
- T. schulthessi (Santschi, 1915)
- T. setosa Ward, 2022
- †T. simplex (Mayr, 1868)
- T. tessmanni (Stitz, 1910)
- T. tucurua Ward, 2001
- T. vantix Fisher, 2025
- T. variegata (Forel, 1895)
- T. vivax Ward, 2001
- T. volucris Ward, 2001
