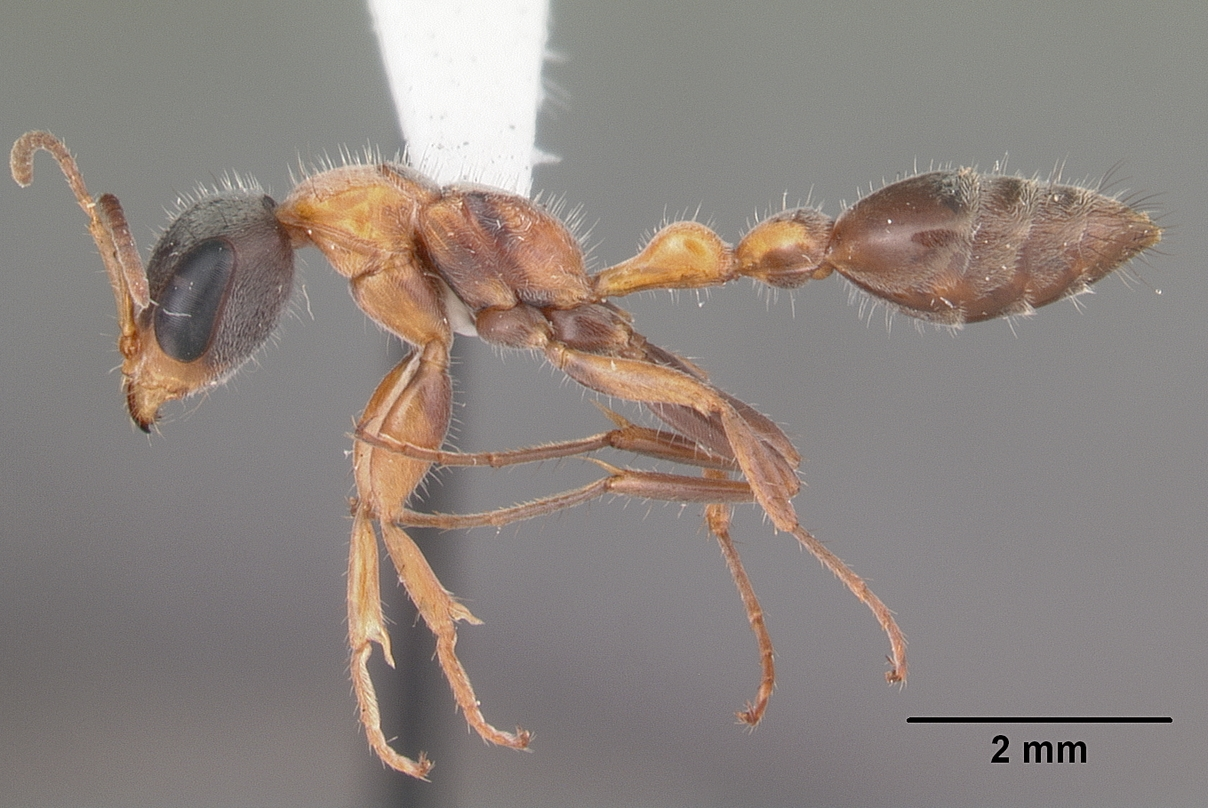
- Pseudomyrmex gracilis (elongate twig ant) worker

Scientific classification
- Kingdom: Animalia
- Phylum: Arthropoda
- Class: Insecta
- Order: Hymenoptera
- Family: Formicidae
- Subfamily: Pseudomyrmecinae; Smith, 1952
- Tribe: Pseudomyrmecini; Smith, 1952

Type genus
- Pseudomyrmex Lund, 1831

= Pseudomyrmecinae =

Subfamily of ants

Pseudomyrmecinae is a small subfamily of ants containing three genera of slender, large-eyed arboreal ants, predominantly tropical or subtropical in distribution. In the course of adapting to arboreal conditions (unlike the predominantly ground-dwelling myrmeciins), the pseudomyrmecines diversified and came to occupy and retain a much wider geographic range.

Pseudomyrmecines consists of 230 described species in three genera. Among those, 32 species live in plant domatia, making them the most diverse plant-occupying ant group worldwide.

== Taxonomy ==
- Pseudomyrmecinae Smith, 1952
  - Pseudomyrmecini Smith, 1952
    - Myrcidris Ward, 1990
    - Pseudomyrmex Lund, 1831
    - Tetraponera Smith, 1852
