= MiR166 microRNA precursor family =

miR166 microRNA precursor
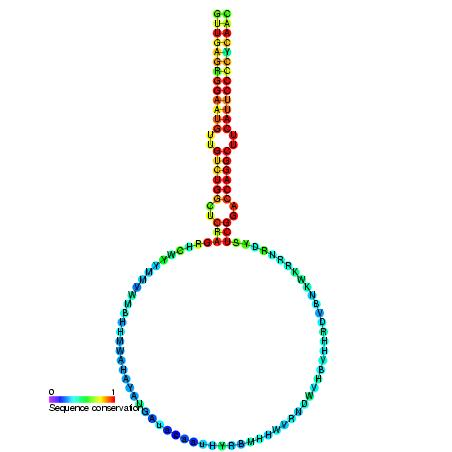
- Predicted secondary structure and sequence conservation of miR166

Identifiers
- Symbol: miR166
- Rfam: RF00075
- miRBase: MI0000201
- miRBase family: MIPF0000004

Other data
- RNA type: microRNA
- Domain: Viridiplantae
- GO: GO:0035195 GO:0035068
- SO: SO:0001244
- PDB structures: PDBe

miR165/166 is a conserved family of plant microRNAs that regulate gene expression by targeting transcripts encoding class III homeodomain–leucine zipper (HD-ZIP III) transcription factors. Members of the family include the closely related microRNAs miR165 and miR166, whose mature sequences differ by only one or two nucleotides and typically regulate the same targets.

The miR165/166 family regulates key developmental processes by repressing HD-ZIP III transcription factors such as PHABULOSA (PHB), PHAVOLUTA (PHV), and REVOLUTA. These transcription factors control developmental patterning including shoot apical meristem maintenance, vascular differentiation, and adaxial–abaxial leaf polarity.

== Target genes ==
The principal targets of miR165/166 are class III HD-ZIP transcription factors, a conserved gene family involved in plant developmental patterning. In Arabidopsis thaliana, several HD-ZIP III genes contain miR165/166 complementary sites in their transcripts. Mutations that disrupt these target sites prevent miRNA-directed cleavage and lead to strong developmental phenotypes, demonstrating the importance of this regulatory interaction.

HD-ZIP III transcription factors regulated by miR165/166 include PHABULOSA, PHAVOLUTA, and REVOLUTA, which control meristem activity, vascular patterning, and organ polarity.

== Role in leaf polarity ==
Leaf polarity depends on antagonistic patterning between adaxial (upper) and abaxial (lower) tissues. miR165/166 accumulates preferentially in abaxial regions of developing leaves and restricts the expression of HD-ZIP III genes to the adaxial domain. This spatial regulation is essential for establishing the flattened morphology of plant leaves.

HD-ZIP II and HD-ZIP III transcription factors can also repress MIR165/166 transcription, forming a feedback regulatory circuit that stabilizes leaf polarity and organ patterning.

== Shoot apical meristem regulation ==
The miR165/166 family also contributes to maintenance of the shoot apical meristem (SAM). In Arabidopsis, the ARGONAUTE protein AGO10 binds miR165/166 and limits their activity in the meristem, preventing excessive repression of HD-ZIP III genes. Loss of AGO10 function leads to increased miR165/166 levels and defects in meristem maintenance.

AGO10 acts as a molecular decoy that preferentially binds miR165/166, preventing their incorporation into AGO1 complexes that mediate target repression.

== Roles in stress responses ==
In addition to developmental functions, the miR165/166 regulatory module has roles in environmental responses. In Arabidopsis, heat stress induces MIR165/166 expression, reducing levels of the target transcription factor PHB. Through regulation of PHB and its interaction with heat shock transcription factors such as HSFA1, the miR165/166–PHB module contributes to thermotolerance and transcriptional reprogramming during heat stress.

== Evolution and conservation ==
Members of the miR165/166 family are conserved across land plants and regulate developmental patterning through highly conserved interactions with HD-ZIP III transcription factors.

== See also ==
- MicroRNA
- miR156 microRNA precursor family
- miR529 microRNA precursor family
- miR535 microRNA precursor family
