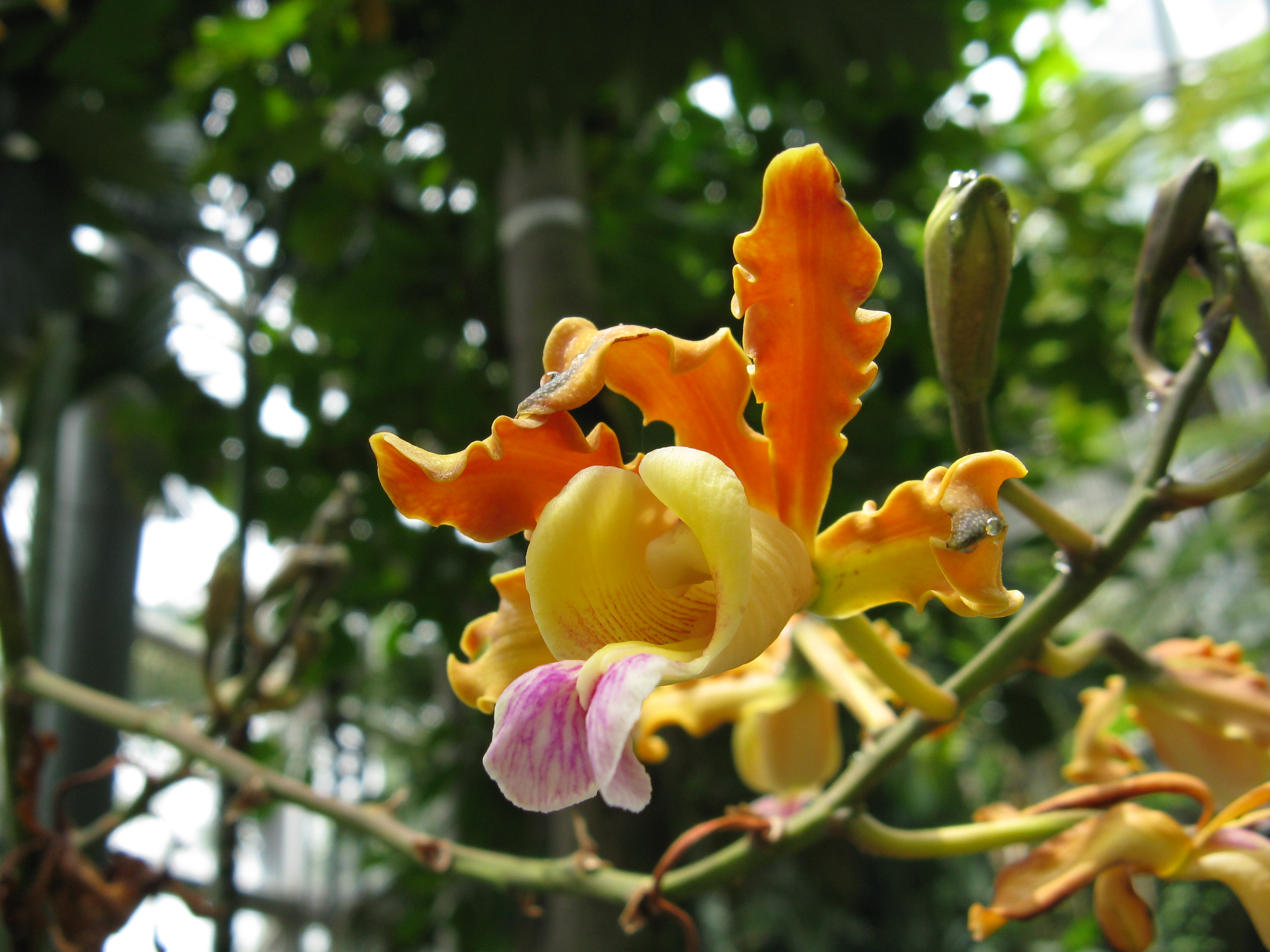
- Myrmecophila brysiana

Scientific classification
- Kingdom: Plantae
- Clade: Tracheophytes
- Clade: Angiosperms
- Clade: Monocots
- Order: Asparagales
- Family: Orchidaceae
- Subfamily: Epidendroideae
- Tribe: Epidendreae
- Subtribe: Laeliinae
- Genus: Myrmecophila; Rolfe, 1917

Type species
- Myrmecophila tibicinis Batem., 1841

= Myrmecophila =

Genus of plants

Myrmecophila is a genus of plants belonging to the family Orchidaceae. It is native to southern Mexico, Central America, the West Indies and Venezuela.

Species in this genus are either epiphytic or lithophytic in their growth habit. Their slightly scented flowers are produced on pole-like growths that extend upwards from 1 to 4 meters high and take up to 4 months to develop. Several of the Schomburgkia species were transferred into the genus Myrmecophila by Robert Allen Rolfe in 1917.

The name Myrmecophila is a derivative of the word myrmecophile and refers to the symbiotic relationship with colonies of ants that are usually found living in the large, hollowed-out, banana-like pseudobulbs. An opening in the base of each pseudobulb serves as an entrance for the ants which harvest nectar from the peduncles and flowers and forage on other plants in the community. The ants associated with Myrmecophila tibicinis pack many of the pseudobulbs with debris that includes other dead ants, a variety of insects, pieces of plant material, seeds and sand. Myrmecophila tibicinis directly utilizes minerals of the organic debris ("garbage dumps") deposited by the ants inside the hollow pseudobulbs. Since the open-canopied trees of the tropics can often be nutrient poor habitats, a small input of nutrients from insects can have a significant effect on plant survival and growth rates. Myrmecophila tibicinis can grow quite well in the absence of ants, though it is quite rare to find an uninhabited plant. The species of ant responsible for forming colonies in Myrmecophila tibicinis are as follows: Brachymyrmex, Camponotus planatus, Camponotus abdominalis, Camponotus rectangularis, and Crematogaster brevispinosa, Monomorium ebenium, Paratrechina longicornis, Zacryptocerus maculatus, and Ectatomma tuberculatum.

== Species ==
Species accepted as of June 2022:

Image	Name	Distribution	Elevation (m)
	Myrmecophila brysiana (Lem.) G.C.Kenn.	Yucatán, Belize, Guatemala, Honduras, Costa Rica	0–200 metres (0–656 ft)
	Myrmecophila christinae Carnevali & Gómez-Juárez	Yucatán, Belize	
	Myrmecophila exaltata (Kraenzl.) G.C. Kenn.	Chiapas, Guatemala	
	Myrmecophila galeottiana (A.Rich.) Rolfe	Chiapas	25–550 metres (82–1,804 ft)
	Myrmecophila grandiflora (Lindl.) Carnevali & J.L.Tapia & I.Ramírez	Southern Mexico	
	Myrmecophila humboldtii (Rchb.f) Rolfe	Central America - Venezuela, Netherlands Antilles	
	Myrmecophila thomsoniana (Rchb.f) Rolfe	Cayman Islands	
	Myrmecophila tibicinis (Rchb.f) Rolfe	Mexico, Central America, Venezuela	300–600 metres (980–1,970 ft)
	Myrmecophila wendlandii (Rchb.f.) G.C.Kenn.	Belize, Guatemala, Honduras	360–1,100 metres (1,180–3,610 ft)

== Natural hybrids ==
Image	Name	Parentage	Distribution	Elevation (m)
	M. × laguna-guerrerae Carnevali, L.Ibarra & J.L.Tapia	Myrmecophila brysiana × Myrmecophila christinae	Quintana Roo	
	M. × parkinsoniana (H.G.Jones) J.M.H.Shaw	Myrmecophila humboldtii × Myrmecophila thomsoniana	Barbados	
	M. × rechingeriana (H.G.Jones) J.M.H.Shaw	Myrmecophila brysiana × Myrmecophila tibicinis	Barbados, Trinidad	

== See also ==
- Schomburgkia - a very close genus
