= George Clayton Kennedy =

Botanist (1919–1980)

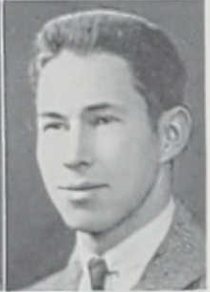
- Photo from Harvard class album of 1940
- Born: 22 September 1919
- Died: 1980 (aged 60–61)
- Scientific career
- Fields: Botany
- Author abbrev. (botany): G.C.Kenn.

George Clayton Kennedy (22 September 1919 – 18 March 1980) was a professor of geochemistry at UCLA and an amateur botanist with an interest in orchids.

Clayton was born in Dillon, Montana, where his parents owned a ranch. He studied at Beaverhead county school before he joined Harvard University where he received a BS, MA and a PhD in mining engineering. He joined the geochemistry department of UCLA in 1953 and worked there until his death. He worked on the melting temperature of rocks in the earth's outer core and proposed some rules that are sometimes termed as Kennedy's law of melting. Based on his ideas of the temperature of the earth's core and theories on earth magnetism, he suggested that the earth could not have a magnetic field, known sometimes as Kennedy's paradox. He worked on thermoluminescence dating and also on the production of artificial diamonds.

He traveled to New Guinea several times in the 1960s and collected ethnographic objects. He also collected orchids across the world and had a collection at home. He also wrote on orchid taxonomy and edited the Orchid Digest. His New Guinea art collections were exhibited at various museums in the US. He also collected art works and one trip he heard from a native American about a totem pole made by his grandfather that had been exhibited at the Chicago World's Fair in 1893. He researched the object and found that it had been donated to a Boy Scout camp in Illinois. He travelled there and discovered it and bought it, reselling it later to a collector. He took an interest in ecology and when he heard about algal blooms caused by fertilizer runoff in California, he suggested the introduction of algae-eating fish from South America.

Kennedy died of cancer.

The standard author abbreviation G.C.Kenn. is used to indicate this person as the author when citing a botanical name.

== Names published ==
(incomplete list)

- Coryanthes bergoldii G.C. Kenn. ex Dodson
- Lycaste mathiasiae G.C.Kenn. Orchid Digest 42(2): 60. 1978
- Myrmecophila brysiana (Lem.) G.C.Kenn. – Orchid Digest 43(6): 210. 1979
- Myrmecophila exaltata (Kraenzl.) G.C.Kenn. – Orchid Digest 43(6): 211. 1979
- Myrmecophila wendlandii (Rchb.f.) G.C.Kenn. – Orchid Digest 43(6): 211. 1979
- Odontoglossum splendens (Rchb.f.) G.C.Kenn. & Garay – Orchid Digest 40(3): 98. 1976
- Rossioglossum (Schltr.) Garay & G.C.Kenn. – Orchid Digest 40(4): 139. 1976
- Rossioglossum grande (Lindl.) Garay & G.C.Kenn. – Orchid Digest 40(4): 142. 1976
- Rossioglossum grande (Lindl.) Garay & G.C.Kenn. var. aureum (Stein) Garay & G.C.Kenn. – Orchid Digest 40: 142. 1976
- Rossioglossum insleayi (Baker ex Lindl.) Garay & G.C.Kenn. – Orchid Digest 40(4): 142. 1976
- Rossioglossum insleayi (Lindl.) Garay & G.C.Kenn. var. leopardinum (Regel) Garay & G.C.Kenn.
- Rossioglossum powellii (Schltr.) Garay & G.C.Kenn. – Orchid Digest 40(4): 142. 1976
- Rossioglossum schlieperianum (Rchb.f.) Garay & G.C.Kenn. – Orchid Digest 40(4): 143. 1976
- Rossioglossum schlieperianum (Rchb.f.) Garay & G.C.Kenn. var. flavidum (Rchb.f.) Garay & G.C.Kenn. – Orchid Digest 40(4): 143. 1976 (IK)
- Rossioglossum splendens (Rchb.f.) Garay & G.C.Kenn. – Orchid Digest 40: 142. 1976 (GCI)
- Rossioglossum splendens (Rchb.f.) Garay & G.C.Kenn. var. imschootianum (Rolfe) Garay & G.C.Kenn. – Orchid Digest 40(4): 143. 1976 (IK)
- Rossioglossum splendens var. imschootianum (Rolfe) Garay & G.C.Kenn. – Orchid Digest 40: 143. 1976 (GCI)
- Rossioglossum splendens (Rchb.f.) Garay & G.C.Kenn. var. leopardinum (Regel) Garay & G.C.Kenn. – Orchid Digest 40(4): 143. 1976 (IK)
- Rossioglossum splendens var. pantherinum (Rchb.f.) Garay & G.C.Kenn. – Orchid Digest 40: 143. 1976 (GCI)
- Rossioglossum williamsianum (Rchb.f.) Garay & G.C.Kenn. – Orchid Digest 40: 143. 1976 (GCI)

(These are not all accepted names.)

== Publications ==
(taken from Orchid Digest Index, incomplete)

"DispelaPulpul Him He Nothing – Something", 1977, Orchid Digest 41 (2)
"The Butterfly orchids: Section Glanduligera of the genus Oncidium", 1977, Orchid Digest 41 (4)
"Encyclia adenocaula and Encyclia kennedyi", 1981, Orchid Digest 45 (2)
"Further notes on the genus Anguloa: confused species of the Anguloa rucheri section", 1978, Orchid Digest 42 (4)
"The genera Schomburgkia and Myrmecophila", 1979, Orchid Digest 43 (6)
"The genus Anguloa", 1976, Orchid Digest 40 (4)
"The genus Clowesia", 1978, Orchid Digest 42 (3)
"The genus Comparettia", 1978, Orchid Digest 42 (5)
"The genus Dracula", 1979, Orchid Digest 43 (1)
"The genus Pabasatia", 1978, Orchid Digest 42 (4)
"The Laelias of Mexico", 1978, Orchid Digest 42 (1)
"Some members of the genus Coryanthes", 1978, Orchid Digest 42 (1)
