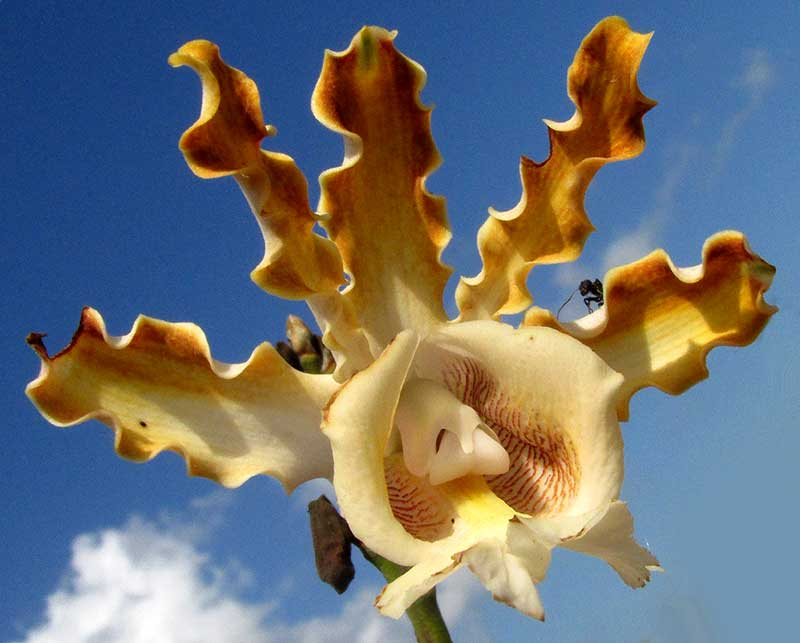
- flower

Scientific classification
- Kingdom: Plantae
- Clade: Embryophytes
- Clade: Tracheophytes
- Clade: Angiosperms
- Clade: Monocots
- Order: Asparagales
- Family: Orchidaceae
- Subfamily: Epidendroideae
- Genus: Myrmecophila
- Species: M. christinae

Binomial name
- Myrmecophila christinae Carnevali & Gómez-Juárez

= Myrmecophila christinae =

Species of plant

Myrmecophila christinae, or Christina's ant-loving orchid, is a species of tree-dwelling orchid native to southeastern Mexico and Belize. It belongs to the family Orchidaceae.

== Description ==
Here are some field marks helping to distinguish Myrmecophila christinae from similar orchid species:

- In mangrove forests it grows epiphytically, but in dunes and low-growing forests its seedlings may get established close to the base of shrubs and eventually grow totally or partially on soil.
- Counting its Inflorescences, it grows up to 2 m (6 ft 6 1/2 in) tall. It stands erect and has short, creeping rhizomes and many thick, white roots. Its hollow pseudobulbs are up to 35 cm (13 3/4 in) long and 3 cm (1 1/4 in) thick, and usually are inhabited by ant colonies who enter and leave through entrances near the plant's base.
- As many as 5 fleshy, leathery leaves at the plant's base are up to 35 cm (14 in) long and 7.5 cm (3 in) wide.
- Raceme-type inflorescences with up to 25 flowers are held stiffly straight on peduncles with several hairless internodes, or sections, 2–5 cm (3/4–2 in) long and each internode is partly covered with tubular bracts.
- As with most orchid flowers, this species' blossoms are resupinate; during the blossom's opening, it twists 180°. Flowers are up to 8 cm (3 1/4 in) in diameter, with parts dull pale-yellow suffused with dark brown-purple or dark chestnut-brown colors along with some pinkish hues and white areas. Both sepals and petals have conspicuously wavy margins. The three sepals are up to 4.6 cm (1 3/4 in) long and 1.3 cm (1/2 in) wide. Of the 3 petals, the side ones are about the length of the sepals, though a little narrower. The middle of the three petals forms a lip, or labellum, which is much modified, up to 4.3 cm (1 3/4 in) long and forming something like a wide funnel with a split at the top where its upcurved sides almost unite. The feature inside the lip's funnel is the column or gynostegium composed of fused male and female sexual parts, a defining feature of orchid flowers.
- Capsular-type fruits have smooth surfaces.

== Distribution ==
Myrmecophila christinae occurs in southeastern Mexico, mainly the Yucatan Peninsula, and Belize.

== Habitat ==
In Mexico's Yucatán Peninsula, the typical Myrmecophila christinae occurs in mangrove forests, among coastal dunes and in low-growing tropical deciduous forests, including frequently flooded ones. The variety ibarrae, limited to the southern Yucatán Peninsula, occurs in regularly flooded, low-growing forest and high-growing forests with perennial leaves.

== Ecology ==
Christina's ant-loving orchids are populated both by several ant species, as well as arboreal termites of the genus Nasutitermes and other termite genera. Ants shelter in the orchids' hollow pseudobulbs. Where tropical storms break away upper tree parts, both ants and termites shelter in dead, hollow branches. Competition exists among different ant species for orchid occupation, resulting in a mosaic pattern of ant species territories, as well competition between ants and termites, resulting in an "ant-termite mosaic" of territories. A study of one mangrove population found 35 ant species sheltering in dead, dry mangrove branches and/or Myrmecophila christinae.

That study also concluded that Christina's ant-loving orchids' success living in the mangroves could be explained by its good adaptation to intense sunlight, wind and high salinity. Also, sheltered ants and termites help the orchid by providing it with minerals. In turn, the orchid provided that ants with nectar. Thus the orchid with its resident ants and termites represent an example of ecological mutualism.

== Phenology ==
In Mexico's Yucatan Peninsula, Myrmecophila christinae blossoms from April into June.

== Conservation status ==
Because of population fragmentation and reduced reproduction rates in smaller fragments, Myrmecophila christinae is considered a threatened species vulnerable to extinction.

== Human uses ==
=== In traditional medicine ===
In southeastern Mexico, the Mayan people make infusions of the pseudobulbs for treating pregnancy pain and wounds.

=== In cultivation ===
Plant breeders crossbreed Myrmecophila christinae, with Cattleya purpurata var. striata to produce a hybrid considered to be "... magnificent in both size and appearance."

Myrmecophila christinae grows in very bright light, warm temperatures and moderate humidity. It should be allowed to dry out between waterings. The species is considered particularly appropriate for mounting on large driftwood.

== Taxonomy ==
In 2001 Germán Carnevali Fernández-Concha and Manuel P. Gómez-Juárez formally described and named Myrmecophila christinae, its varieties and a hybrid. The type specimen was collected among coastal dunes by G. Carnevali and F. May, their #4445, at Chixchulub, Yucatán, Mexico.

=== Varieties ===
In the original description of Myrmecophila christinae, the variety ibarrae also was named and described. It was said that it varied only slightly from the typical M. christinae var. christinae and will "...probably prove to grade into it should the appropriate habitat occcur..." Visible differences noted were that in var. ibarrae the inflorescence often developed one or two branches, the flowers are smaller, and flower color tends more toward dark chestnut with less pink or purple in the labellum. Distribution maps also indicate that variety ibarrae occurs at the southern boundary of the species distribution and is more likely to be inland.

=== Phylogeny ===
A study based on morphology, anatomy and internal transcribed spacers 1 and 2 produced a phylogenetic tree based on maximum parsimony in which Myrmecophila christinae was sister to Myrmecophila grandiflora.

=== A natural hybrid ===
Based on morphological traits, a natural hybrid has been recognized between Myrmecophila christinae and Myrmecophila brysiana, referred to as Myrmecophila x lagunae-guerrerae, and occurring on the Mexican Gulf Coast.

=== Etymology ===
The genus name Myrmecophila is based on the Greek words myrmex, meaning "ant," and philos meaning "friend," alluding to the mutualistic relationship between species of this genus and ants.

The species name christinae often is said to honor the wife of the species' author, Germán Carnevali. However, the plant actually honors Ingrid Christine Olmsted, a prominent USA-Mexican ecologist who studied ecosystems in Mexico's Yucatán Peninsula.

== Gallery ==
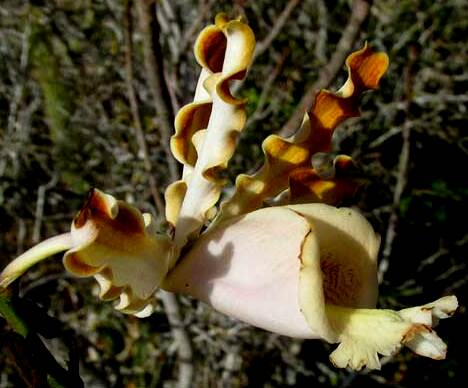
flower side view

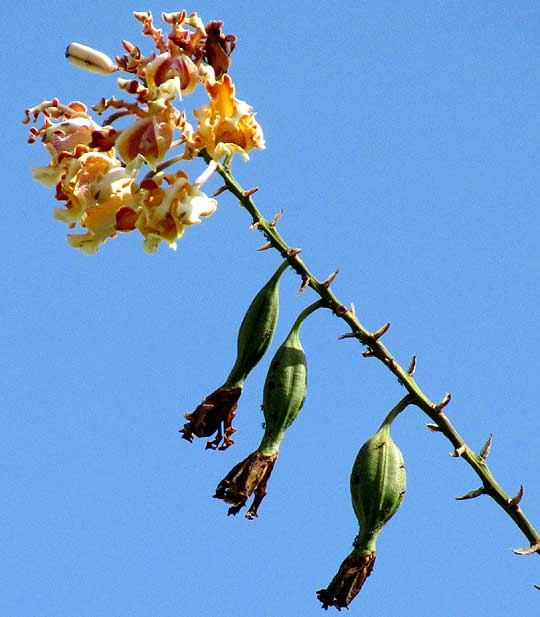
flowers and immature fruits

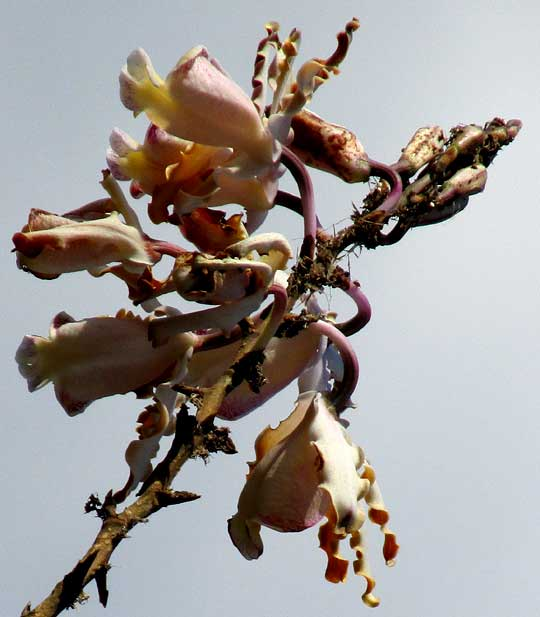
ant debris in inflorescence

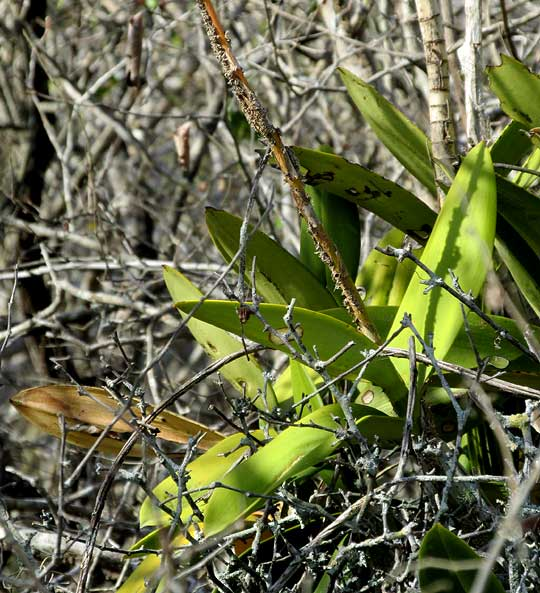
leaves at base of plant, ant debris on peduncle

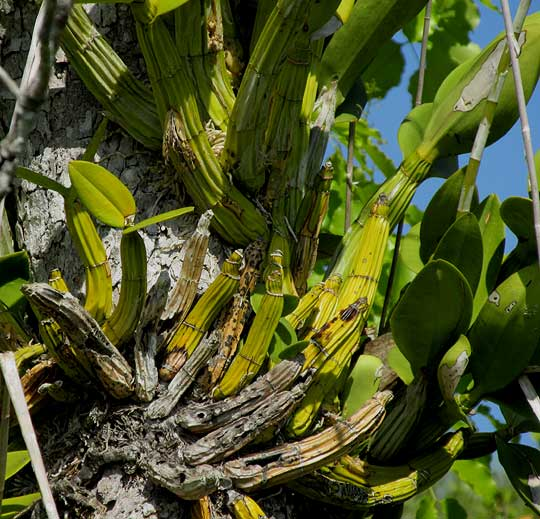
pseudobulbs

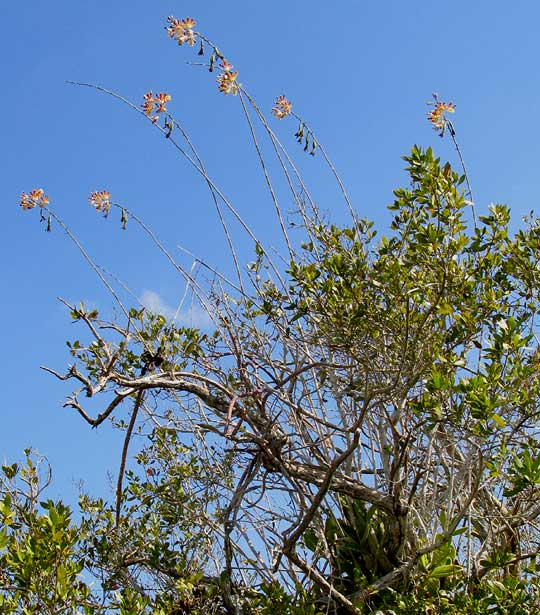
plants in mangrove tree

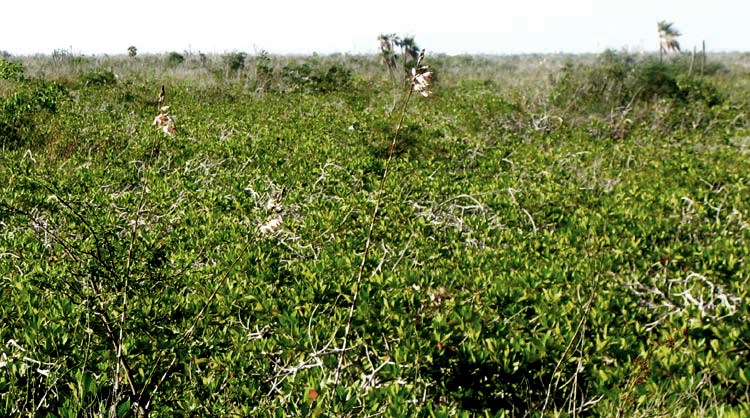
mangrove habitat with numerous orchids
