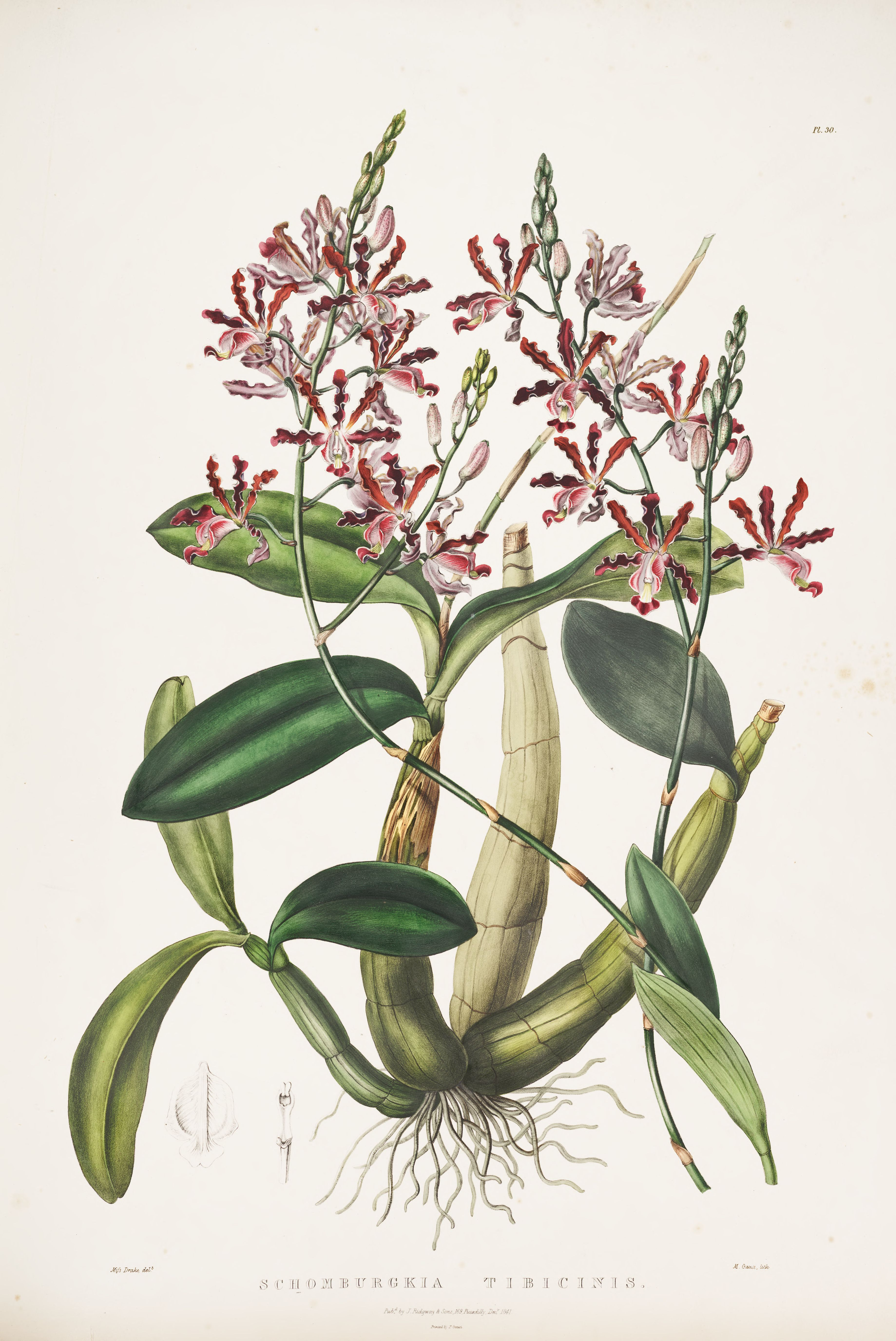
- Myrmecophila tibicinis (illust. Sarah Ann Drake)

Scientific classification
- Kingdom: Plantae
- Clade: Tracheophytes
- Clade: Angiosperms
- Clade: Monocots
- Order: Asparagales
- Family: Orchidaceae
- Subfamily: Epidendroideae
- Genus: Myrmecophila
- Species: M. tibicinis

Binomial name
- Myrmecophila tibicinis (Bateman ex Lindl.) Rolfe

Synonyms
- Bletia tibicinis (Bateman ex Lindl.) Rchb.f. Cattleya tibicinis (Bateman ex Lindl.) Beer; Laelia tibicinis (Bateman ex Lindl.) L.O.Williams; Schomburgkia brysiana var. intermedia H.G.Jones; Schomburgkia campecheana Kraenzl. Schomburgkia intermedia (H.G.Jones) Withner

= Myrmecophila tibicinis =

Species of orchid

Myrmecophila tibicinis is an orchid in the genus Myrmecophila. A common name for the species is the trumpet player's Schomburgkia. It was first described by Bateman in 1838, as Epidendrum tibicinis, and assigned to the genus Myrmecophila by Rolfe in 1917.

It is found growing in seasonally dry deciduous forest at elevations from 300 to 600 metres in full sun on trunks and larger branches in Belize, Costa Rica, Guatemala, Honduras, Venezuela and Colombia.

The pseudobulbs are large (18 in or 45 cm) and in the wild, there are always ants living in the pseudobulb, with their debris supplying additional nutrients.

It may be confused with M. brysiana but differs in having a larger magenta flower and a larger column while M. brysiana has smaller flowers which are yellow.
