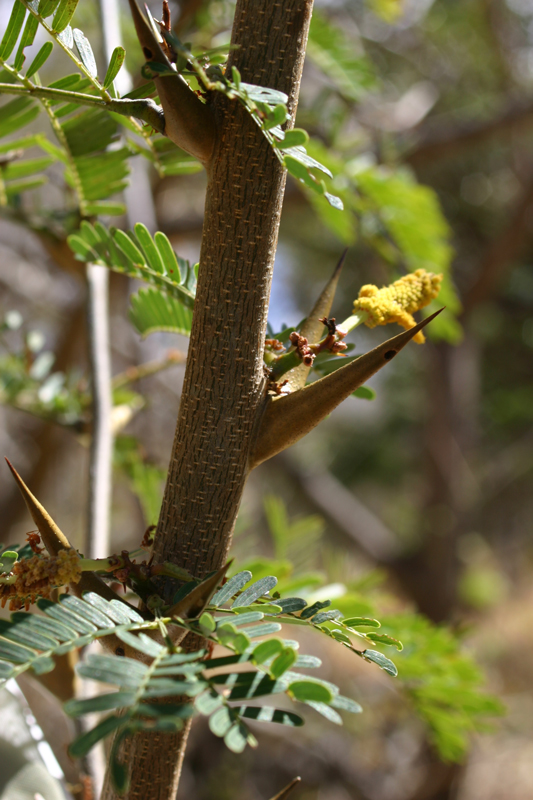
- V. collinsii in Guanacaste, Costa Rica.

Scientific classification
- Kingdom: Plantae
- Clade: Embryophytes
- Clade: Tracheophytes
- Clade: Spermatophytes
- Clade: Angiosperms
- Clade: Eudicots
- Clade: Rosids
- Order: Fabales
- Family: Fabaceae
- Subfamily: Caesalpinioideae
- Clade: Mimosoid clade
- Genus: Vachellia
- Species: V. collinsii

Binomial name
- Vachellia collinsii (Saff.) Seigler & Ebinger

Synonyms
- Acacia collinsii Saff.

= Vachellia collinsii =

Species of legume

Vachellia collinsii, previously Acacia collinsii, is a species of flowering plant native to Central America and parts of Africa.

== Distribution ==
Vachellia collinsii is native to Central America and parts of Africa. In southern Central America, where there are seasonally dry ecosystems, this tree grows in secondary succession, preferring Savanna-like climates. Acacias like full sun and are rarely found in the trophic understory of many jungles. Acacias can thrive in climates with higher humidity, above 70% humidity. The Vachellia collinsii has a wide distribution across the world compared to other acacias, as well as a wide ecological distribution, considering it can grow from sea level to 1000 meters elevation.

== Description ==
Vachellia collinsii can grow upwards of 40 feet tall. The tree grows relatively straight with thorns generously distributed across the branches. The small, pinnate leaves grow opposite from each other similar to a Mimosa. Since this species has a diverse geological and ecological distribution, it has a wider range of morphological traits. Nonetheless, differences between other ant-acacias can be seen through elongated cylindrical inflorescences, somewhat small stipular spines, terete—cylindrical—spines that wrap around a cross section, 3-5 often dome-shaped petiolar glands, a lack of rachis glands, and leaflets with lateral veins. On the petioles, are green bumps called extrafloral nectaries that create sugar for symbiotic ants. From top to bottom of these trees, there is less suppression of lateral growth, thus, allowing for more numerous and full branches near the base of the tree, creating a pyramid shape with a strong central trunk. While most tree species typically have auxin that grow downward, suppressing branch growth on the sides, this is not the case for Vachellia Collinsii, as it lacks a strong apical meristem. This results in branching throughout the entire length of the tree. They are extrafloral because the true, yellow flowers produce a different kind of nectar. The tips of leaflets may produce Beltian bodies, food bodies which are rich in protein and lipids. These are also created as part of their symbiotic relationship with ants.

== Ecology ==
Vachellia collinsii exhibits a symbiotic relationship with several species of ants. Some noted species include Pseudomyrmex spinicola and Pseudomyrmex ferruginea. The ant-Vachellia system involving this species has been studied by ecologists like Daniel Janzen in Palo Verde National Park and Santa Rosa National Park, which are both located in Guanacaste Province, Costa Rica. The ants chew holes in the tips of the hollow stipular thorns, known as domatia, so that they can enter and create their colony inside. A single ant colony may span several V. collinsii trees. Medium sized herbivores are often deterred by the thorns alone, but the ants help protect the trees from other potentially threatening animals. Smaller animals such as caterpillars have no issue avoiding the thorns, and larger animals like elephants are less affected by these thorns. When a predator brushes and shakes the plant’s thorns in an attempt to feed, the ants will become disturbed, run outside, and release alarm pheromones to alert other ants. All ants that come in contact with the alarm pheromones become aggressive and attack the animal by biting and stinging. Beyond defending the trees from herbivores, ants occupying V. collinsii trees may even cut down surrounding vegetation and trim the encroaching branches of other plants. This provides V. collinsii with valuable space and unimpacted access to sunlight, allowing the trees to thrive. In exchange, V. collinsii not only provides the ants with hollow thorns in which to live, but also produces lipid- and protein-rich food bodies, known as Beltian bodies, on the tips of new leaflets. These bodies are consumed by the ants, providing critical nutrients for the colony. When starved of nutrients, V. collinsii produces more Beltian bodies to encourage the presence of ants. When the tree has enough extra nutrients, it will create less Beltian bodies. This behaviour suggests a feedback loop. Vachellia collinsii also provides the ants with sugar-rich nectar from extrafloral nectaries located at the leaf petiole. Since there are several species of ants that may occupy a V. collinsii, there has been observations of intraspecific interactions between these species of ants, especially between Pseudomyrmex spinicola and Crematogaster brevispinosa. C. brevispinosa may take over trees occupied by Pseudomyrmex spinicola or Pseudomyrmex nigrocinctus. C. brevispinosa will also occupy trees that are dying or heavily damaged, or trees that were previously inhabited. Furthermore, a hypothesized benefit to hosting ant colonies is that the acacia may have receptors within the domatia for ant feces that triggers absorption pathways for additional nutrient uptake at the extremities of the plant's stem tissue. When ants defecate in the domatia, their feces contain nutrients from their food which could be good for the plant. This allows the plant to obtain additional nutrients and in a shorter period of time as the nutrients do not need to travel all the way up starting from the roots.

== Chemical ecology ==
The symbiotic ants living on this tree become alarmed at tissue disruption of the plant’s leaves by herbivores like the scarab, Pelidnota punctulate. This beetle only feeds on ant-acacias and is protected by its heavy cuticle. Tissue disruption of the tree leaves releases trans-2-hexenal, a compound that ants detect as a kairomone. On exposure to test samples of this compound, the ants displayed alarm behavior. This compound is not found in the mandibular gland secretions of Costa Rican acacia ants, that are likely to be the source of the ant’s alarm pheromones.

== Development ==
Diving deeper into why the species produce traits of the “swollen thorn syndrome,” the mechanism and pathways are still unknown but there have been experiments and strong evidence related to a change in gene expression of miR156/miR157 and SPL transcription factors, in different environmental conditions. The production of food bodies that are high in proteins and lipids as well as extrafloral nectaries is very costly so the plant must have some indication of when to start producing those traits. Generally, an acacia will not produce these traits immediately after germinating so it is age dependent and the extrafloral nectaries will be produced first around 50–75 days of age, then swollen and elongated stipules, followed by full beltian bodies. Along with the production of these traits, are declines in miR156/miR157 genes. The miR156-SPL pathway has been known in many plants to coordinate when the plant flowers as well as plant development combined with stress tolerance. In Arabidopsis, the miR156 will keep the plant juvenile, then become suppressed when it is in the right conditions in order to further develop adult traits. When put in low light conditions, there is higher miR156/miR157 as well as a delay in swollen thorn syndrome traits. The other way around is also true in that when put in well lit conditions such as the natural environment, there is a low expression of miR156/miR157 genes when the plant is producing extrafloral nectaries, swollen stipules, and beltian bodies. Although it is unknown how the expression of the traits are linked to the miR156/miR157 genes, hypotheses include temporal coordination or regulation where the miR156/157 turn on and off in a pattern in order to turn on those genes for the swollen thorn syndrome (which are still unknown). There is also evidence that these traits are part of their defense mechanism and that nectar secretion from the extrafloral nectaries depend on jasmonic acid but the mechanism is unknown as jasmonic acid could have a different function here than in a typical plant. The developmental timing of the “Swollen Thorn Syndrome” can also be influenced by natural selection as well. More research needs to be done on what developmental constraints and factors that may have influenced the later development of these traits.

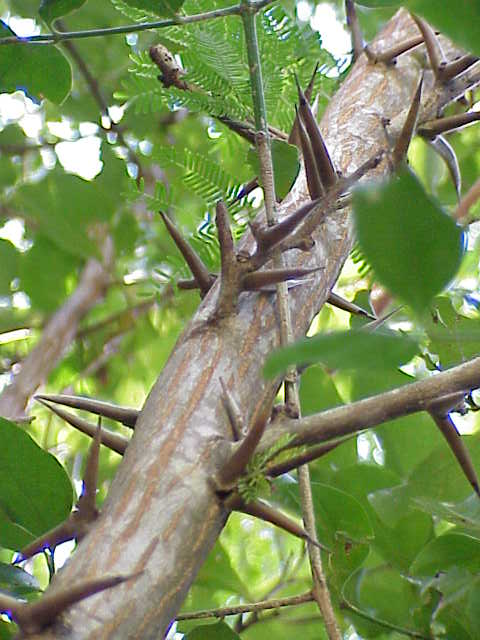
Vachellia collinsii Thorns (domatia)
