= Thomas Belt =

English geologist and naturalist

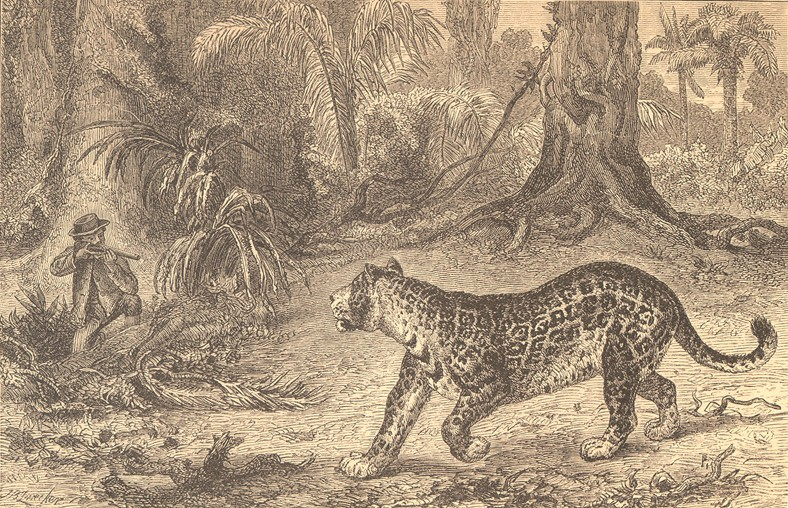
Frontispiece of Belt's The Naturalist in Nicaragua (1874)

Thomas Belt FGS (1832 – 21 September 1878), an English geologist and naturalist, was born at Newcastle-on-Tyne in 1832, and educated in that city. He is remembered for his work on the geology of gold bearing minerals, glacial geology, and for his description of the mutualistic relationship between certain bullthorn Acacia species and their Pseudomyrmex ants.

== Early life ==
As a youth Belt became actively interested in natural history through the Tyneside Naturalists' Field Club. In 1852 he went to Australia and for about eight years worked at the gold-diggings, where he acquired a practical knowledge of ore deposits. In 1860 he proceeded to Nova Scotia to take charge of some gold-mines, and there met with a serious injury, which led to his return to England.

In 1861 Belt issued a separate work entitled Mineral Veins: an Enquiry into their Origin, founded on a Study of the Auriferous Quartz Veins of Australia. Later on he was engaged for about three years at Dolgelly, another though small gold-mining region, and here he carefully investigated the rocks and fossils of the Lingula Flags, his observations being published in an important and now classic memoir in the Geological Magazine for 1867. He was elected in 1866 a Fellow of the Geological Society of London.

== Nicaragua ==
In 1868 he was appointed to take charge of some mines in Nicaragua, where he passed four active and adventurous years the results being given in his The Naturalist in Nicaragua (1874), a widely regarded work. Henry Walter Bates gave assistance and supervised the book's printing by the publishing house J. Murray. In this volume the author expressed his views on the former presence of glaciers in Nicaragua.

In this book, he also first described the mutualistic relationship of certain Acacias and the ant we now know as Pseudomyrmex spinicola. These are a species of red myrmecophyte-inhabiting neotropical ants which are found only in Nicaragua and Costa Rica. They live in the thorns of a tropical tree, Acacia collinsii, feeding on nectaries along with the protein and lipid-rich pods produced by the plant for the ants and now known as Beltian bodies (or Belsian bodies) in honor of Belt.

In subsequent papers Belt dealt boldly with the phenomena of the glacial period in Britain and in various parts of the world.

== Death and burial ==
After many further expeditions to Russia, Siberia and Colorado, he was traveling to Colorado for a professional engagement when he fell suddenly ill and died in Denver, on 21 September 1878, at the age of 45. He was buried there in the Riverside Cemetery in Denver.
