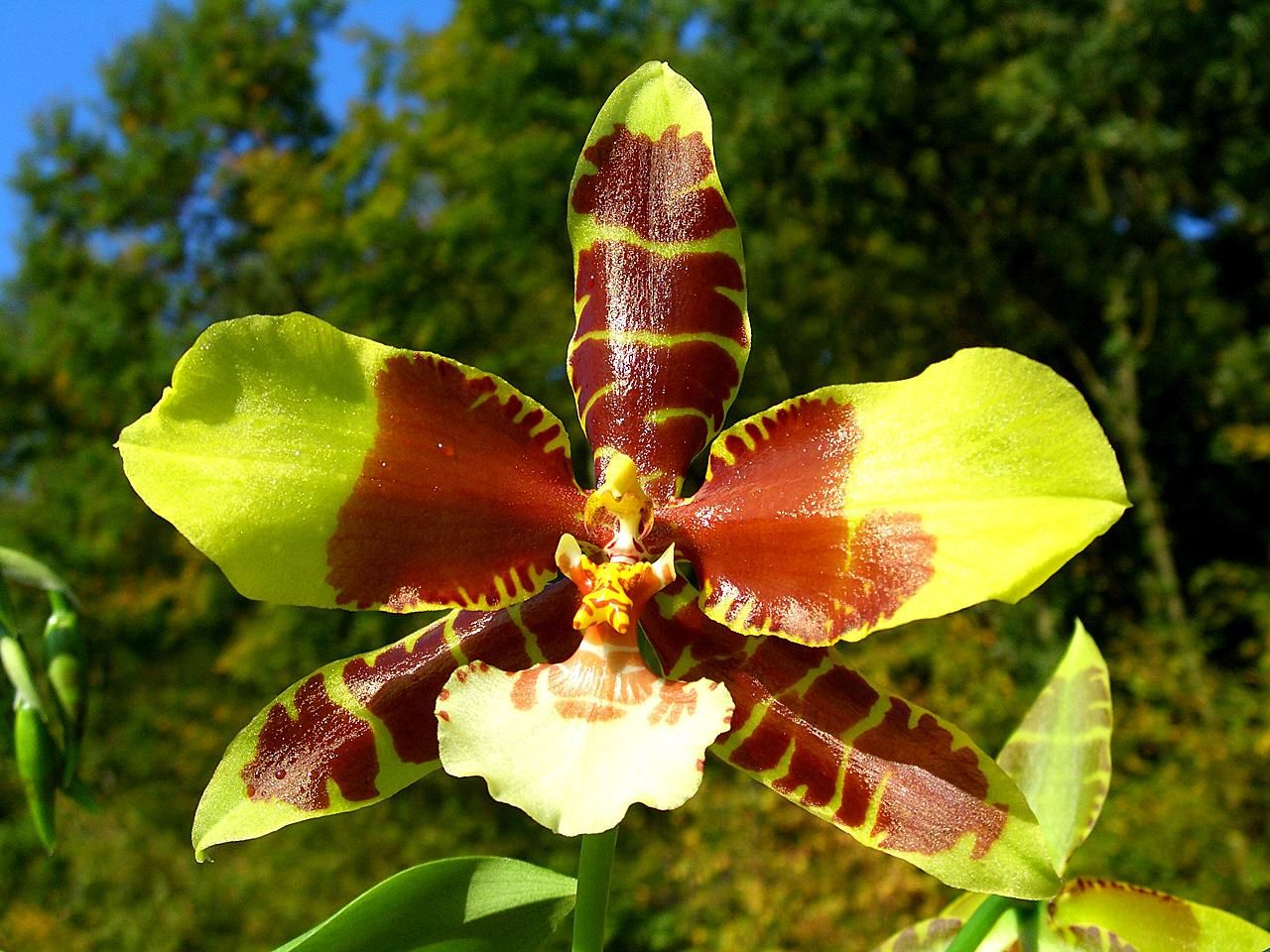
- Rossioglossum grande

Scientific classification
- Kingdom: Plantae
- Clade: Tracheophytes
- Clade: Angiosperms
- Clade: Monocots
- Order: Asparagales
- Family: Orchidaceae
- Subfamily: Epidendroideae
- Tribe: Cymbidieae
- Subtribe: Oncidiinae
- Genus: Rossioglossum (Schltr.) Garay & G.C.Kenn.

Synonyms
- Ticoglossum Lucas Rodr. ex Halb.; Chelyorchis Dressler & N.H.Williams in G.A.Romero & G.Carnevali

= Rossioglossum =

Genus of orchids

Rossioglossum is a genus of flowering plants from the orchid family, Orchidaceae. It has 9 currently recognized species (as of May 2014), all native to Mexico, Central America, and northern and western South America.

== List of species ==
As of November 2024, Plants of the World Online accepted the following species:

Image	Scientific name	Distribution	Elevation (m)
	Rossioglossum ampliatum (Lindl.) M.W.Chase & N.H.Williams	from Guatemala to Venezuela and Peru	
	Rossioglossum beloglossum (Rchb.f.) J.M.H.Shaw	Mexico, Belize, Guatemala, Honduras, El Salvador, Nicaragua and Costa Rica	700–2,100 metres (2,300–6,900 ft)
	Rossioglossum grande (Lindl.) Garay & G.C.Kenn.	Chiapas, Guatemala, El Salvador, Costa Rica	1,400–2,700 metres (4,600–8,900 ft)
	Rossioglossum hagsaterianum Soto Arenas	Nayarit, Jalisco	1,300–2,000 metres (4,300–6,600 ft)
	Rossioglossum insleayi (Baker ex Lindl.) Garay & G.C.Kenn.	from Jalisco to Oaxaca	
	Rossioglossum krameri (Rchb.f.) M.W.Chase & N.H.Williams	Nicaragua, Costa Rica, Panama	600–1,400 metres (2,000–4,600 ft)
	Rossioglossum malpighioides (Archila, Szlach. & Chiron) J.M.H.Shaw	Guatemala	
	Rossioglossum oerstedii (Rchb.f.) M.W.Chase & N.H.Williams	Costa Rica, Panama	
	Rossioglossum pardoi (Carnevali & G.A.Romero) J.M.H.Shaw	Colombia, Trinidad-Tobago, Venezuela	
	Rossioglossum schlieperianum (Rchb.f.) Garay & G.C.Kenn.	Guatemala, El Salvador, Costa Rica, Panama	1,200–2,800 metres (3,900–9,200 ft)
	Rossioglossum splendens (Rchb.f.) Garay & G.C.Kenn.	Oaxaca	1,300–2,000 metres (4,300–6,600 ft)
	Rossioglossum williamsianum (Rchb.f.) Garay & G.C.Kenn	Chiapas, Guatemala, Honduras	1,000 metres (3,300 ft)

== See also ==
- List of Orchidaceae genera
