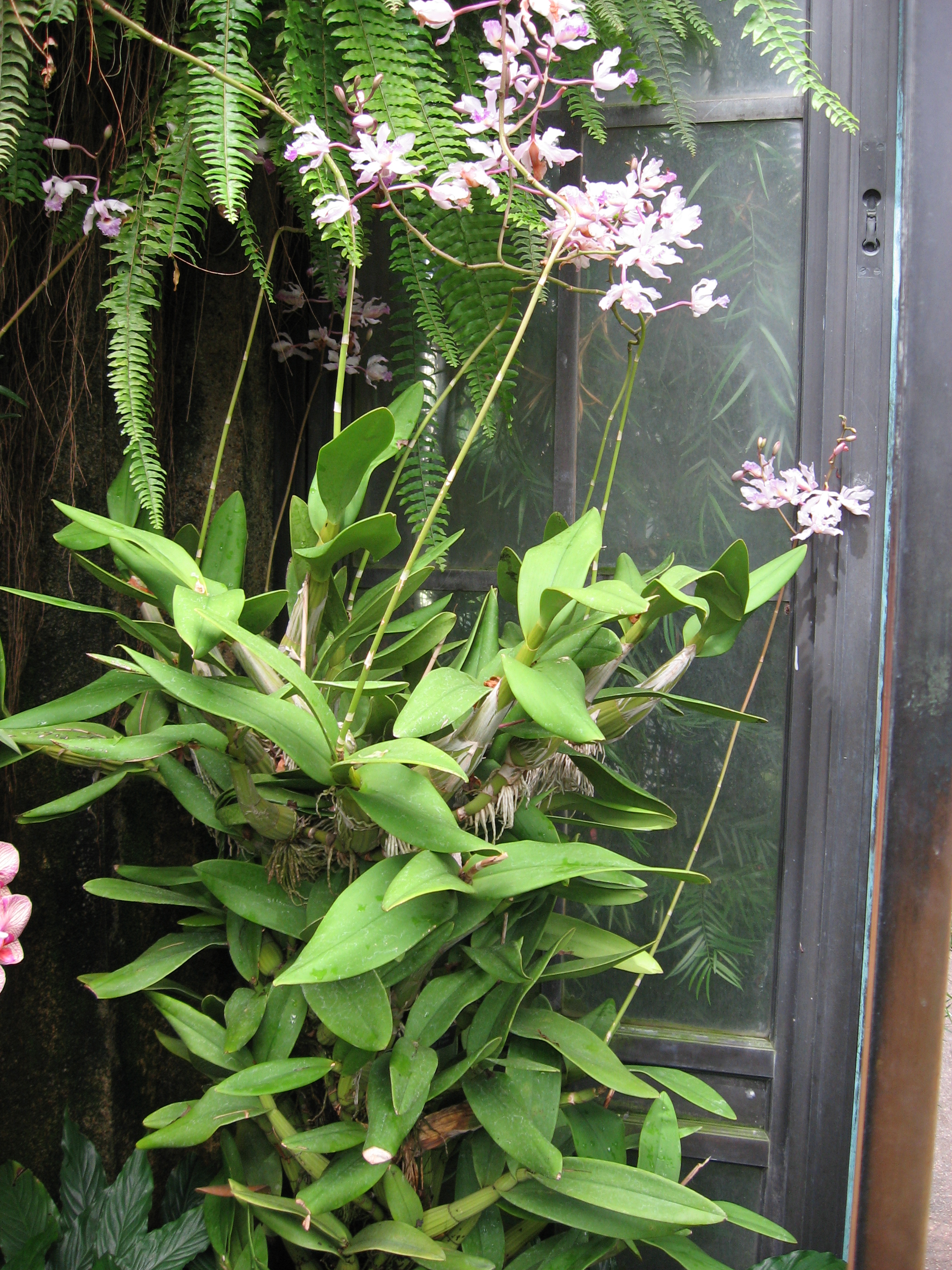
- Myrmecophila humboldtii

Scientific classification
- Kingdom: Plantae
- Clade: Tracheophytes
- Clade: Angiosperms
- Clade: Monocots
- Order: Asparagales
- Family: Orchidaceae
- Subfamily: Epidendroideae
- Genus: Myrmecophila
- Species: M. humboldtii

Binomial name
- Myrmecophila humboldtii Rolfe, 1917

Synonyms
- Epidendrum humboldtii Rchb.f.; Schomburgkia humboldtii (Rchb.f.) Rchb.f.; Bletia humboldtii (Rchb.f.) Rchb.f. in W.G.Walpers; Laelia humboldtii (Rchb.f.) L.O.Williams; Schomburgkia humboldtii var. breviscapa H.G.Jones

= Myrmecophila humboldtii =

Species of orchid

Myrmecophila humboldtii is a species of orchid. The species is named after Alexander von Humboldt. Its natural distribution is from Venezuela and the ABC islands (Bonaire and Curaçao; apparently extinct in Aruba).
