= Sarah Drake =

British botanical illustrator

Sarah A. Drake
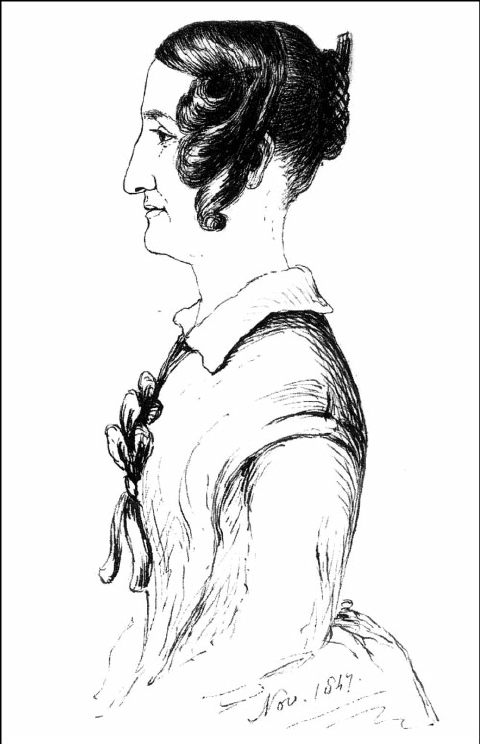
- Sarah Drake, sketched by Sarah Lindley or Barbara Lindley, daughters of John Lindley, in November 1847
- Born: 24 July 1803; Skeyton, Norfolk, England
- Died: 9 July 1857 (aged 53); United Kingdom
- Known for: Botanical art

Sarah Anne Drake (1803–1857) was an English botanical illustrator who worked for John Lindley and collaborated with Augusta Innes Withers, Nathaniel Wallich and others.

== Biography ==
Sarah Anne Drake was born in Skeyton, England on 24 July 1803, the same area of Norfolk as the London University botanist John Lindley and went to school with Lindley's sister Anne. John Lindley had a particular interest in the illustration of orchids and would eventually invite Sarah Drake to become an illustrator with him and study a variety of plants. As a young woman, she went to Paris, where she probably studied painting as was expected of young women of the day. In 1830 "Ducky" (as she became known) moved into the Lindley home at Acton Green in London. She appears to have had a number of roles in the Lindley home, including that of governess, but eventually took up botanical art, gradually taking over from Lindley the illustration of his botanical publications. She created illustrations for his Sertum Orchidaceae, for example, as well as over 1000 illustrations for the horticultural magazine Edwards's Botanical Register, which Lindley edited from 1829 to 1847. More than 300 of these drawings were of orchids and Lindley named the Western Australian orchid genus Drakaea in her honour. She also contributed illustrations to the Transactions of the Horticultural Society of London.

Drake is perhaps best known for her collaboration with Augusta Innes Withers on the drawings for the monumental Orchidaceae of Mexico and Guatemala by James Bateman. This was elephant folio size (pages about 58 cm (23 inches) long) and issued in parts between 1837 and 1843. She did the drawings for 16 of the 40 drawings while Withers did the others (apart from one by Jane Edwards). The illustrations were enlarged by Maxim Gauci. However, Drake also contributed to Lindley's book, Ladies' Botany (1834–1837), Nathaniel Wallich's Plantae Asiaticae Rariores, John Forbes Royle's Illustrations of the botany and other branches of the natural history of the Himalayan Mountains and to The Botany of HMS Sulphur (1836–1842). Most of her imagery laid the groundwork for other drawings to blossom and take inspiration from. Drake’s inherent talent regarding composition and arrangement of her plant specimens helps separate her from others who engaged in botanical illustration. She did not travel abroad and probably went no further than Kew Gardens, the Lindley home or to Loddiges nursery, which put on a display of orchids especially for her.

Drake's career ended when the Botanical Register went out of business in 1847. Sarah would end up contributing more than one thousand paintings and drawings in her short career. She returned to Norfolk to care for elderly relatives and moved in with her uncle, Daniel Drake. In 1852 she married John Sutton Hastings, a wealthy farmer. She died on 9 July 1857, putatively from diabetes, but it has been speculated that she may have suffered from cumulative poisoning from her painting materials. In 2000 a memorial plaque commemorating her work was unveiled at the parish church where she is buried.

Illustrations from Sertum Orchidaceum
Illustrations from The Botany of the Voyage of H.M.S. Sulphur
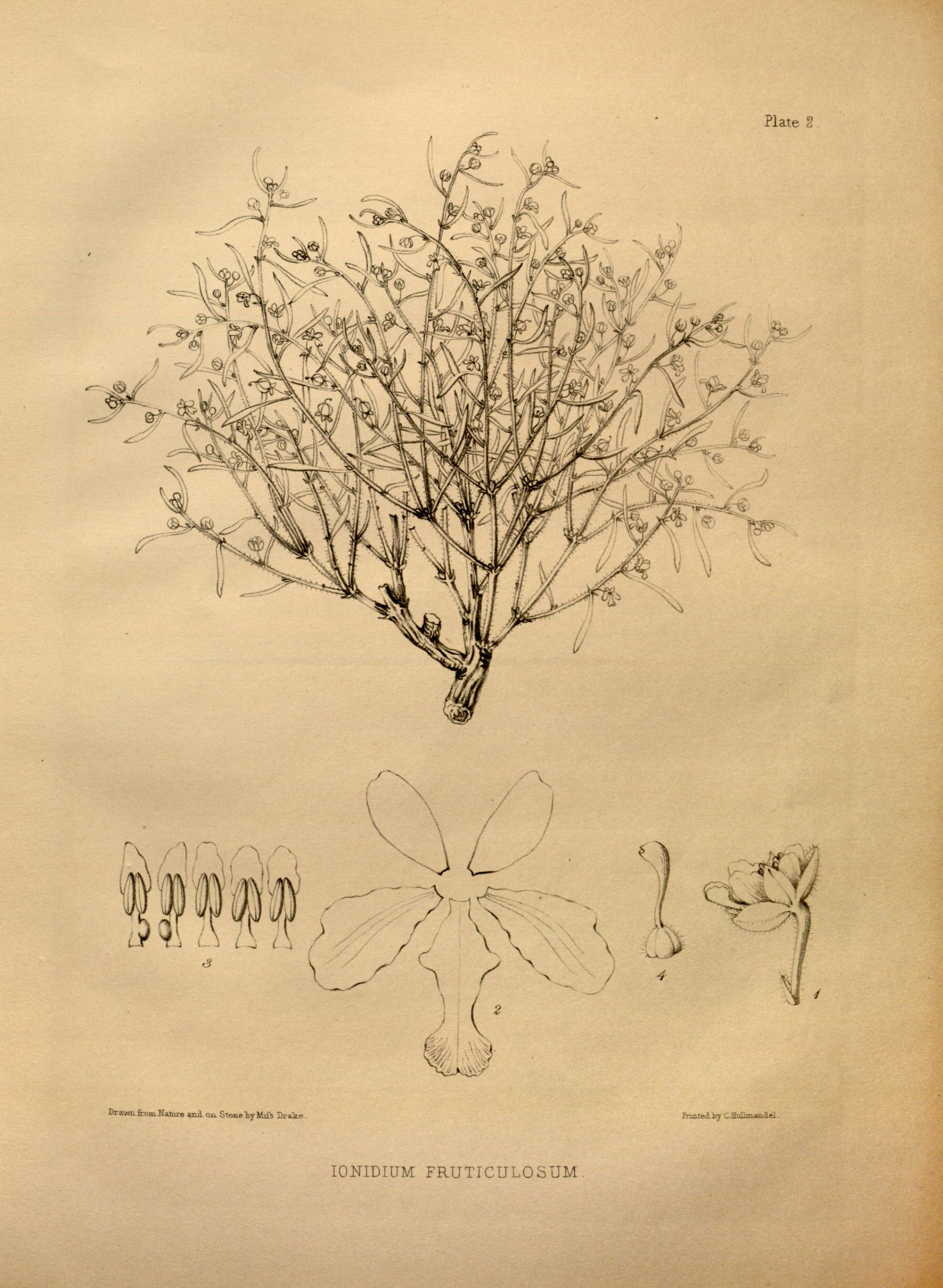
Iodidium fruticulosum (now Hybanthus fruticulosus)

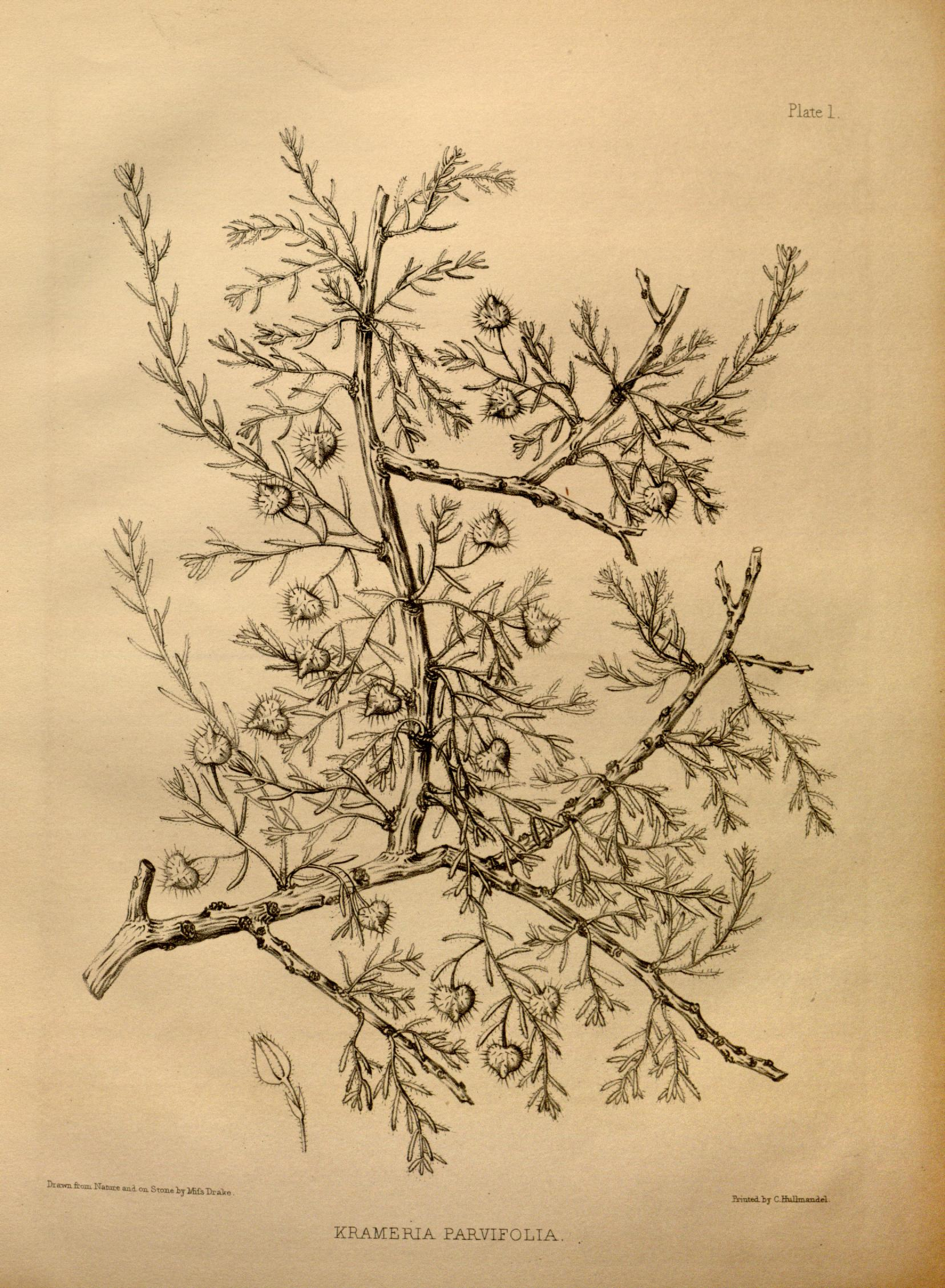
Krameria parvifolia (now Krameria erecta)

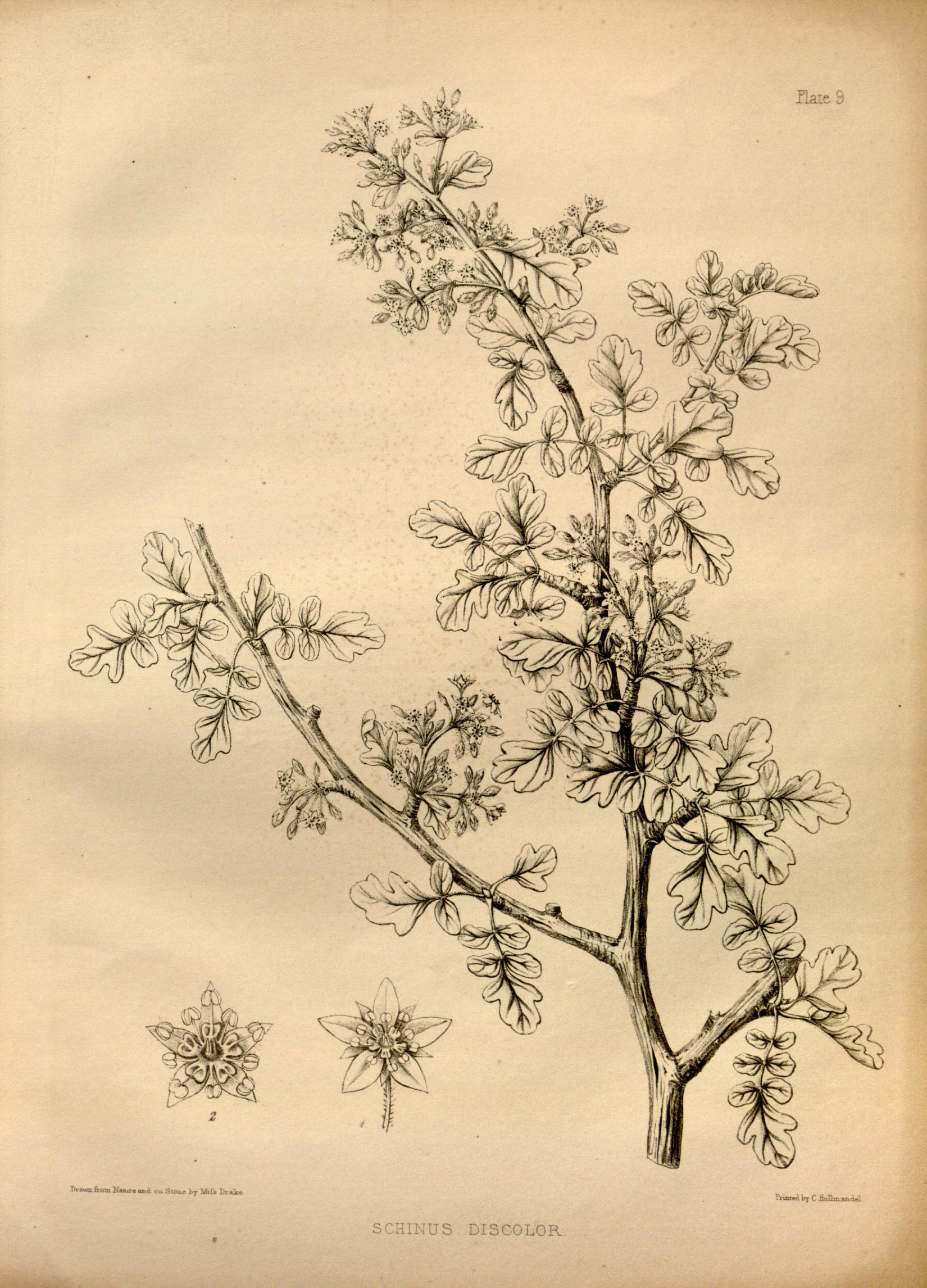
Schinus discolor (now Pachycormus discolor)

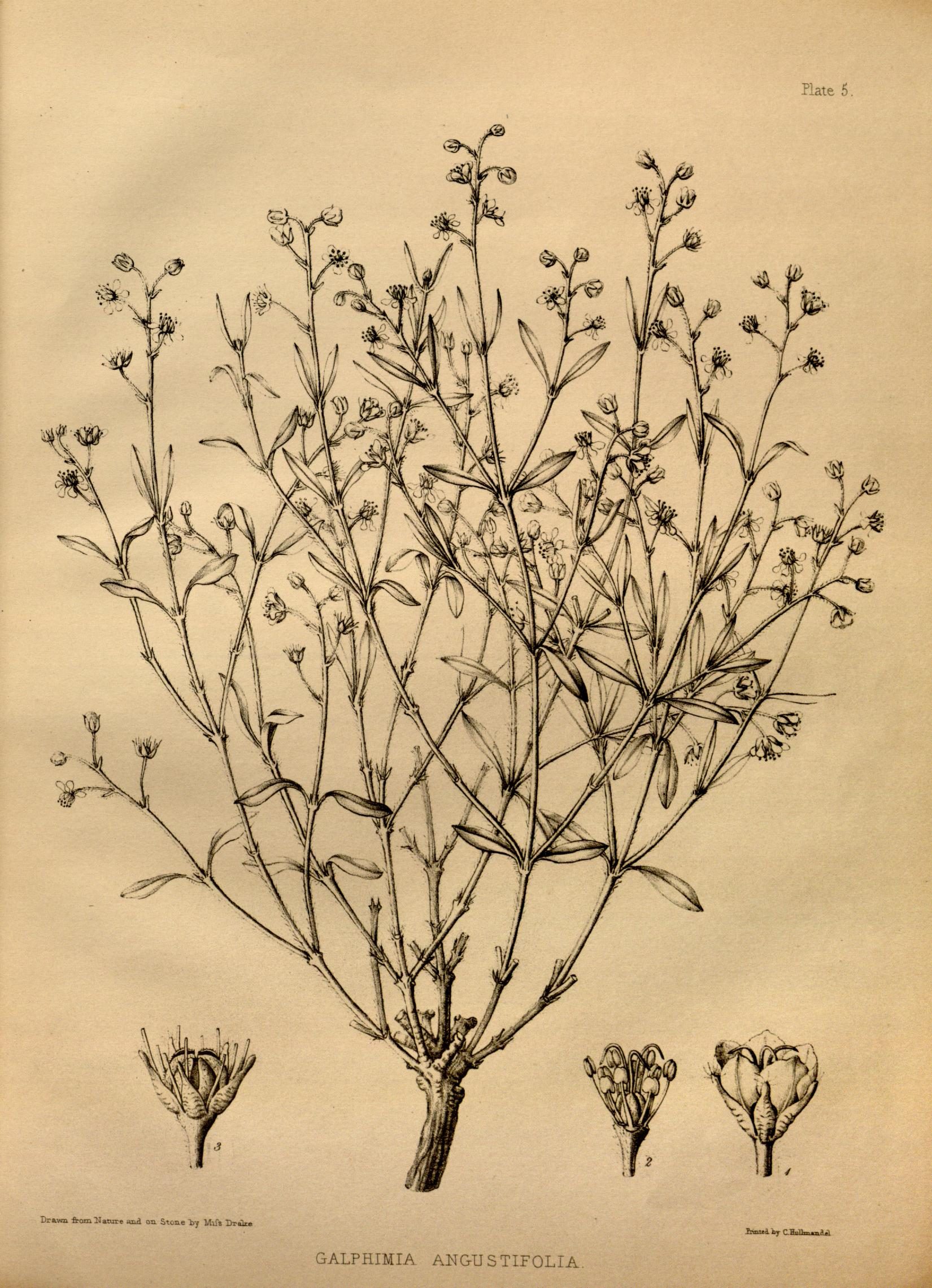
Galphimia angustifolia
Illustrations from The Orchidology of Mexico and Guatemala
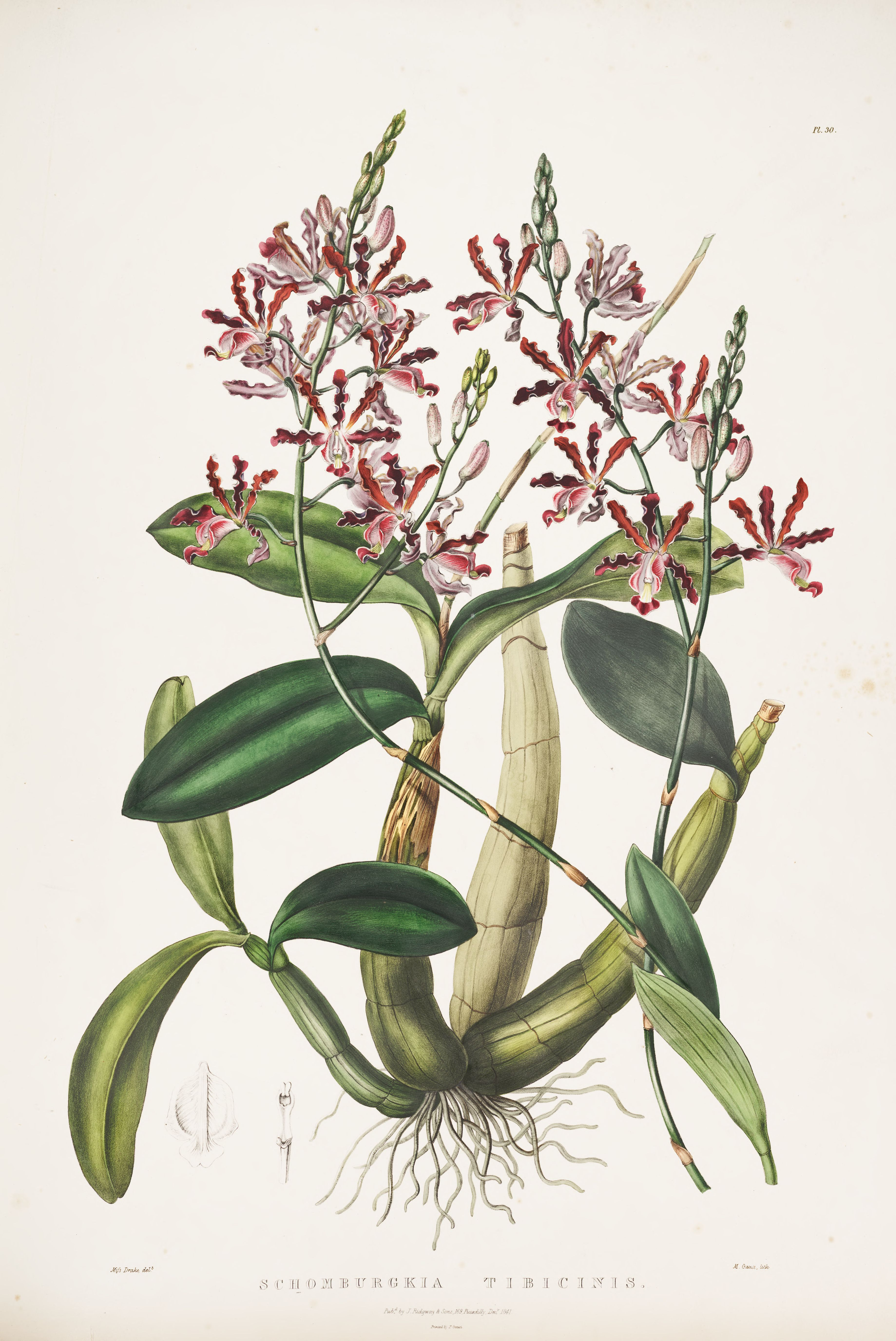
Schomburgkia tibicinis (now Myrmecophila tibicinis)

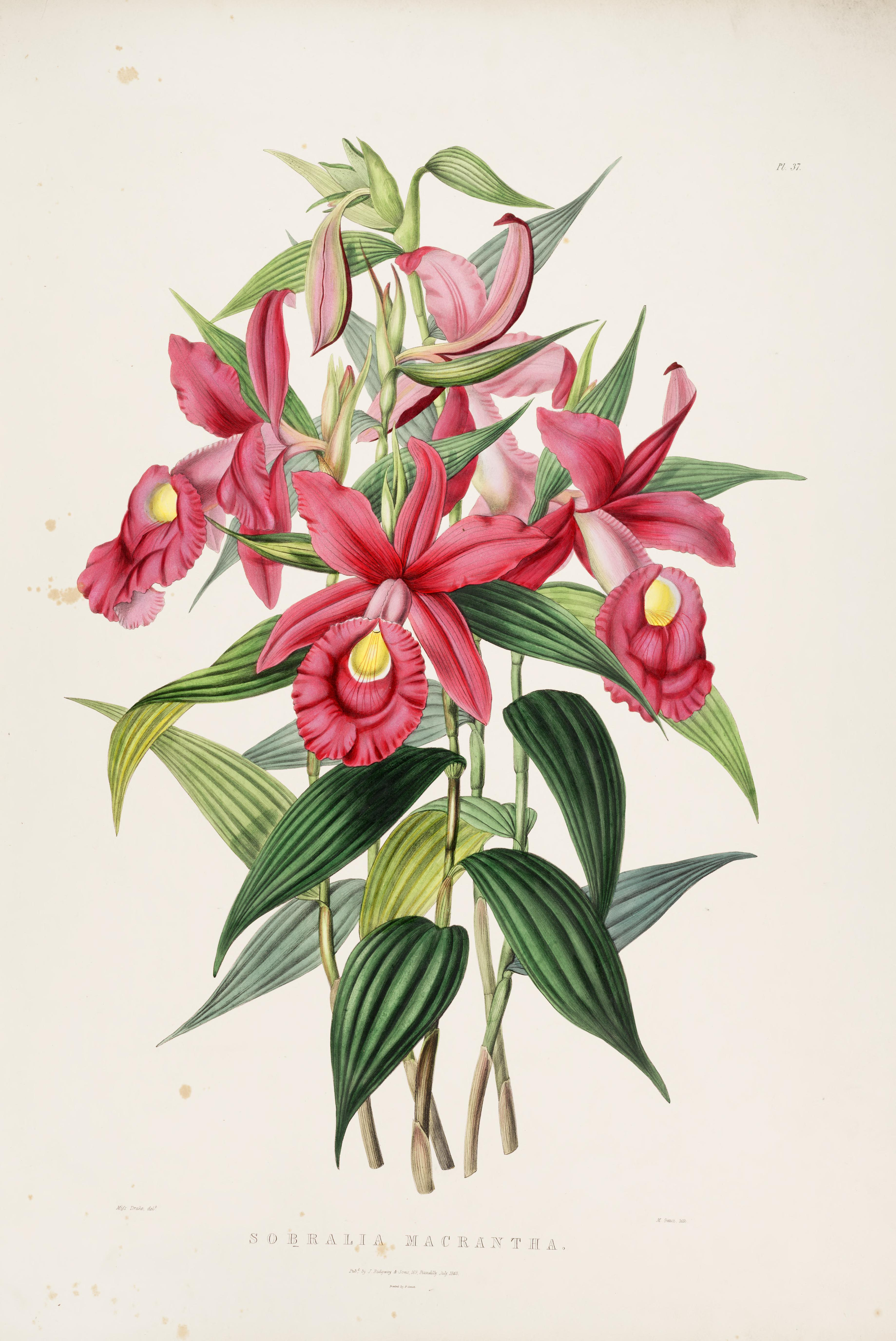
Sobralia macrantha
Other images by Sarah Drake
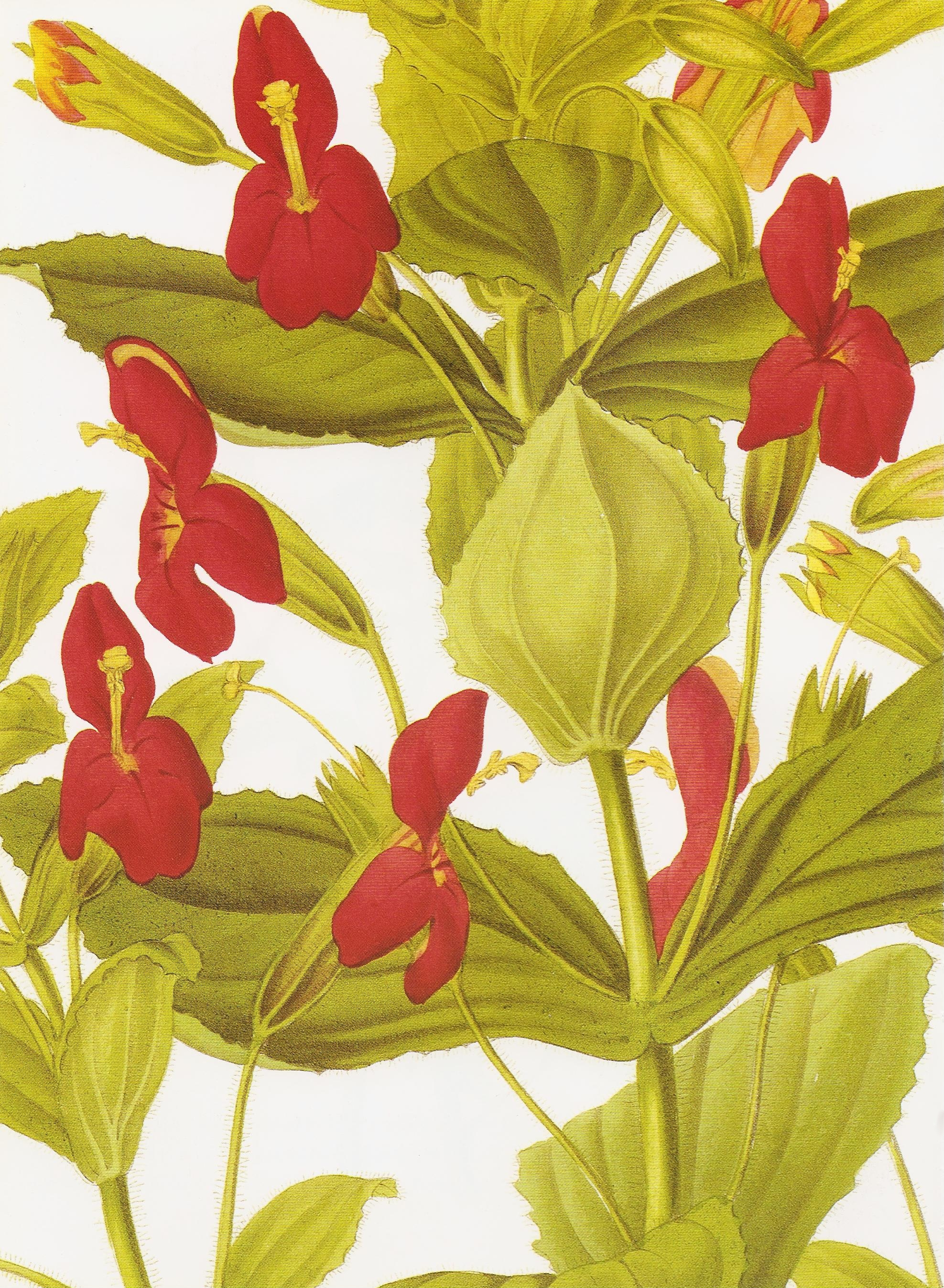
Scarlet monkeyflower (now Erythranthe cardinalis)

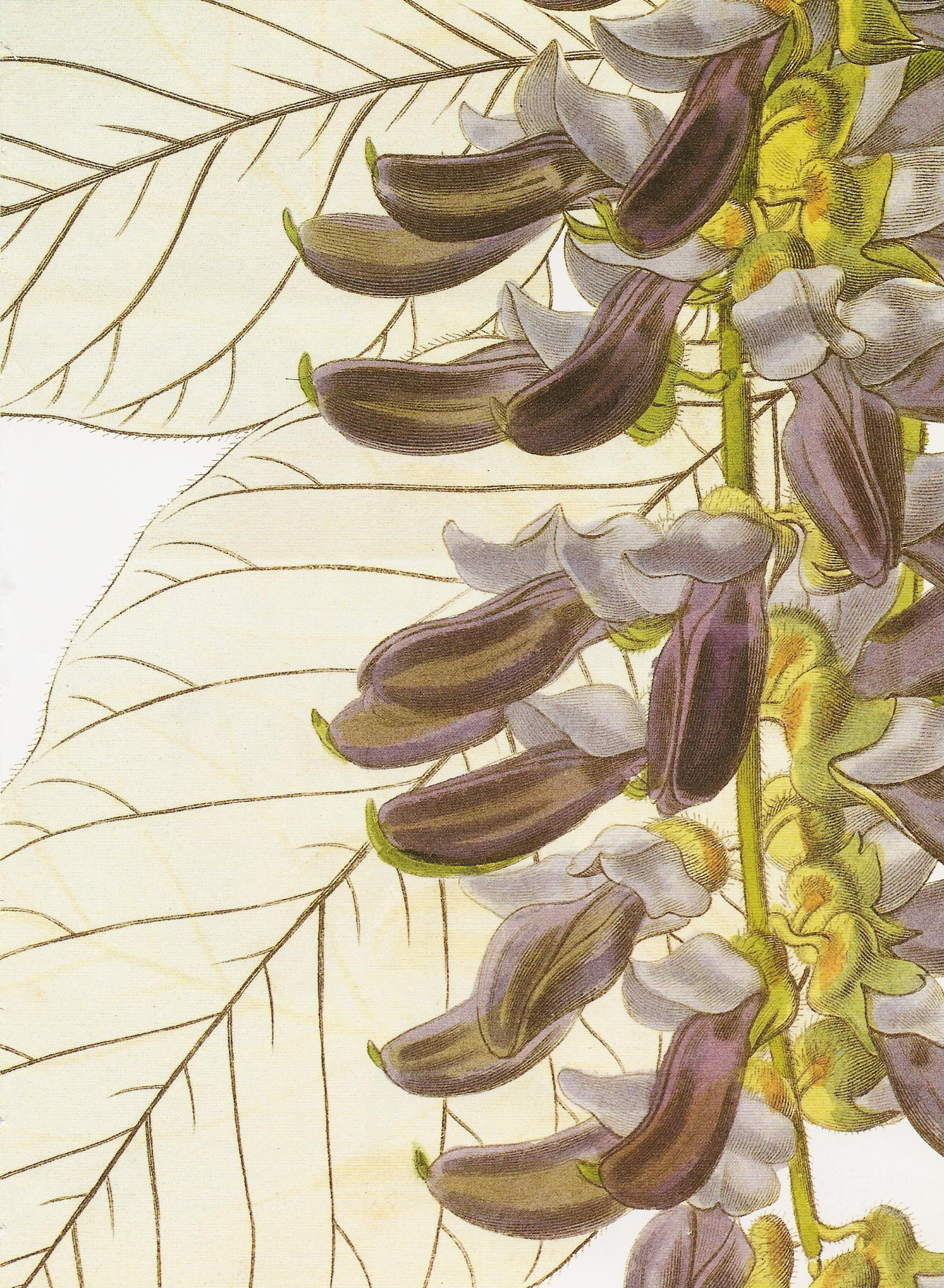
Velvet bean (Mucuna pruriens)

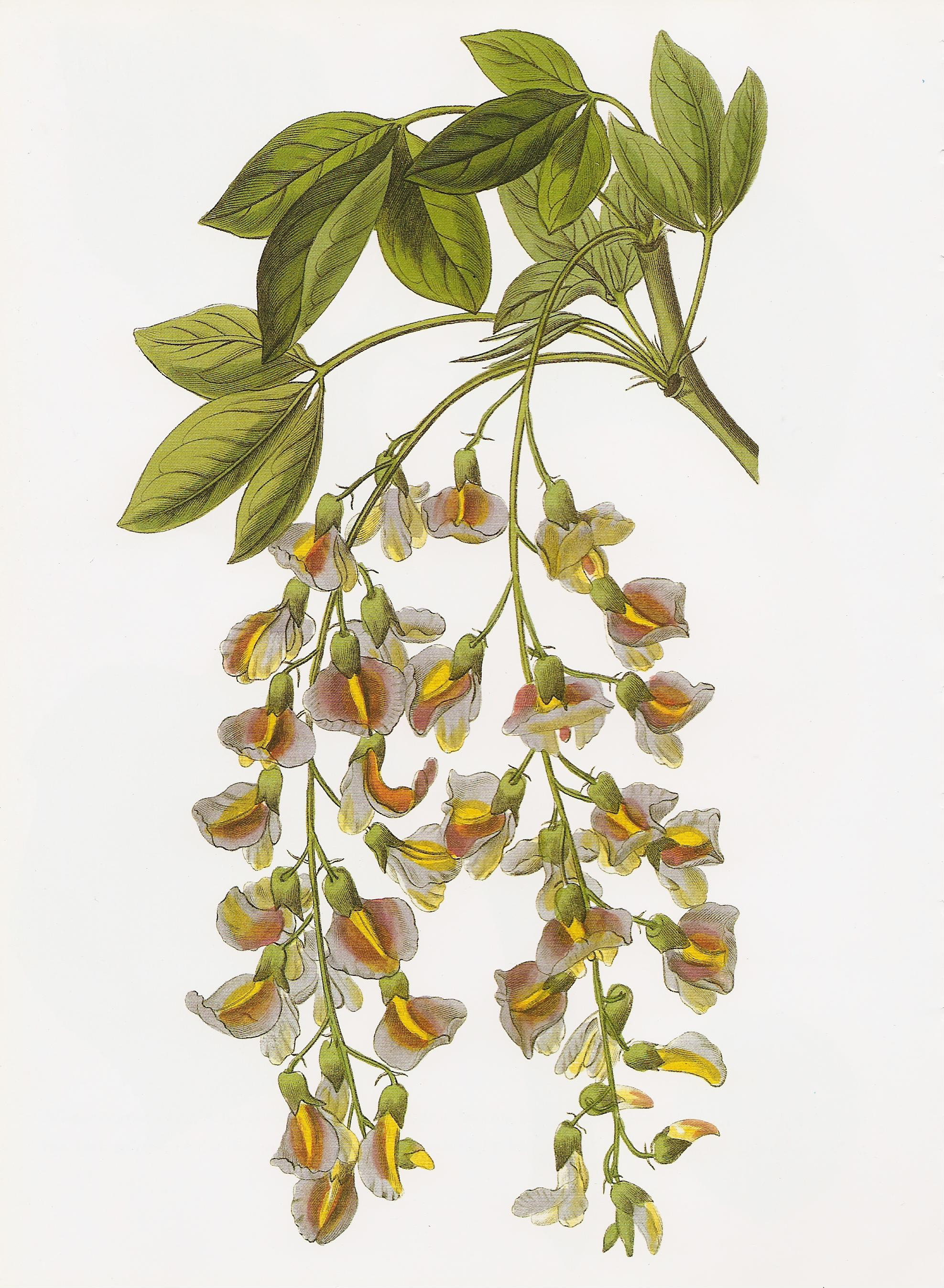
Adam's laburnum (+Laburnocytisus adamii)

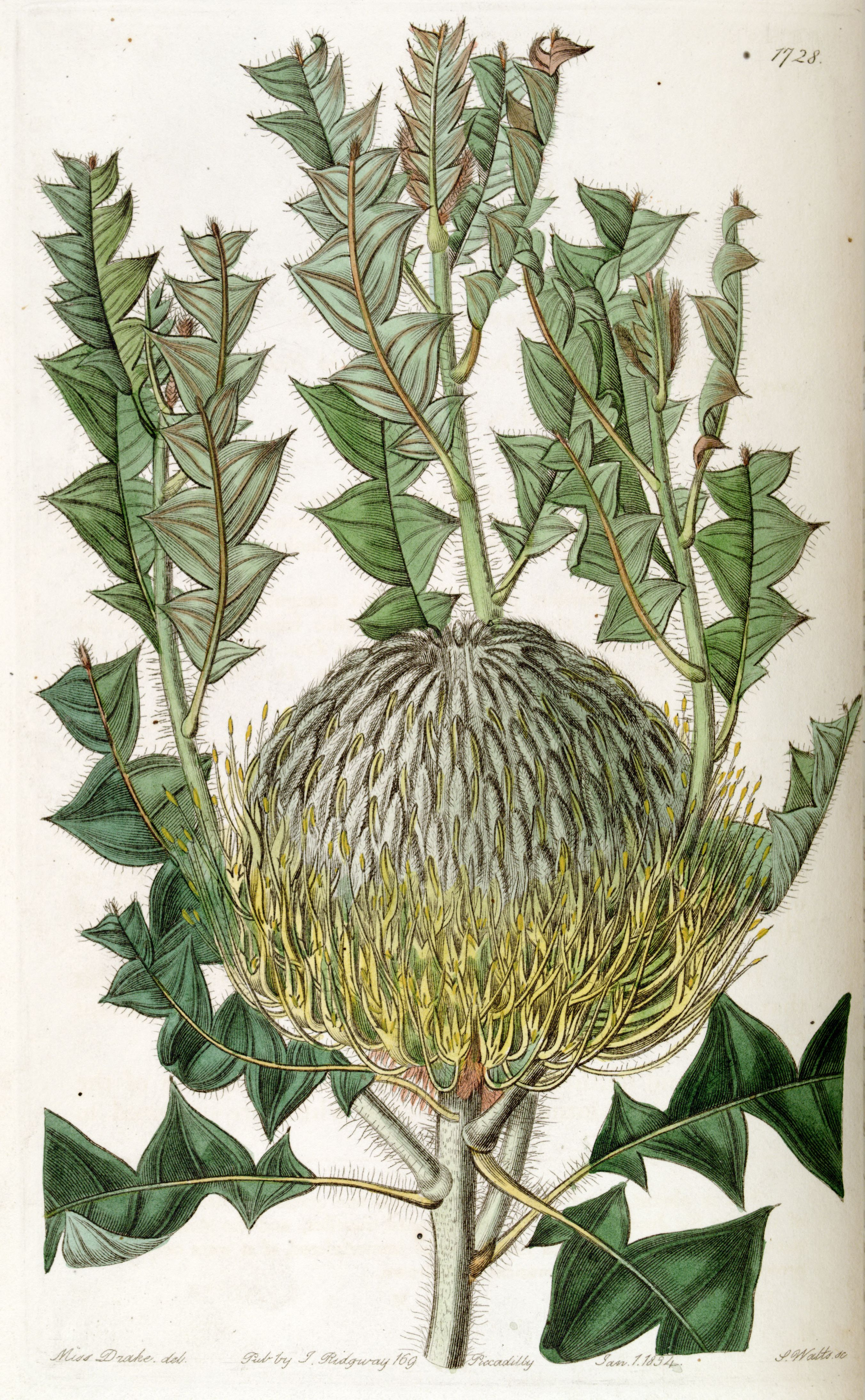
Banksia speciosa - Plate 1728 of Edwards's Botanical Register, Volume 20, signed "Miss Drake"

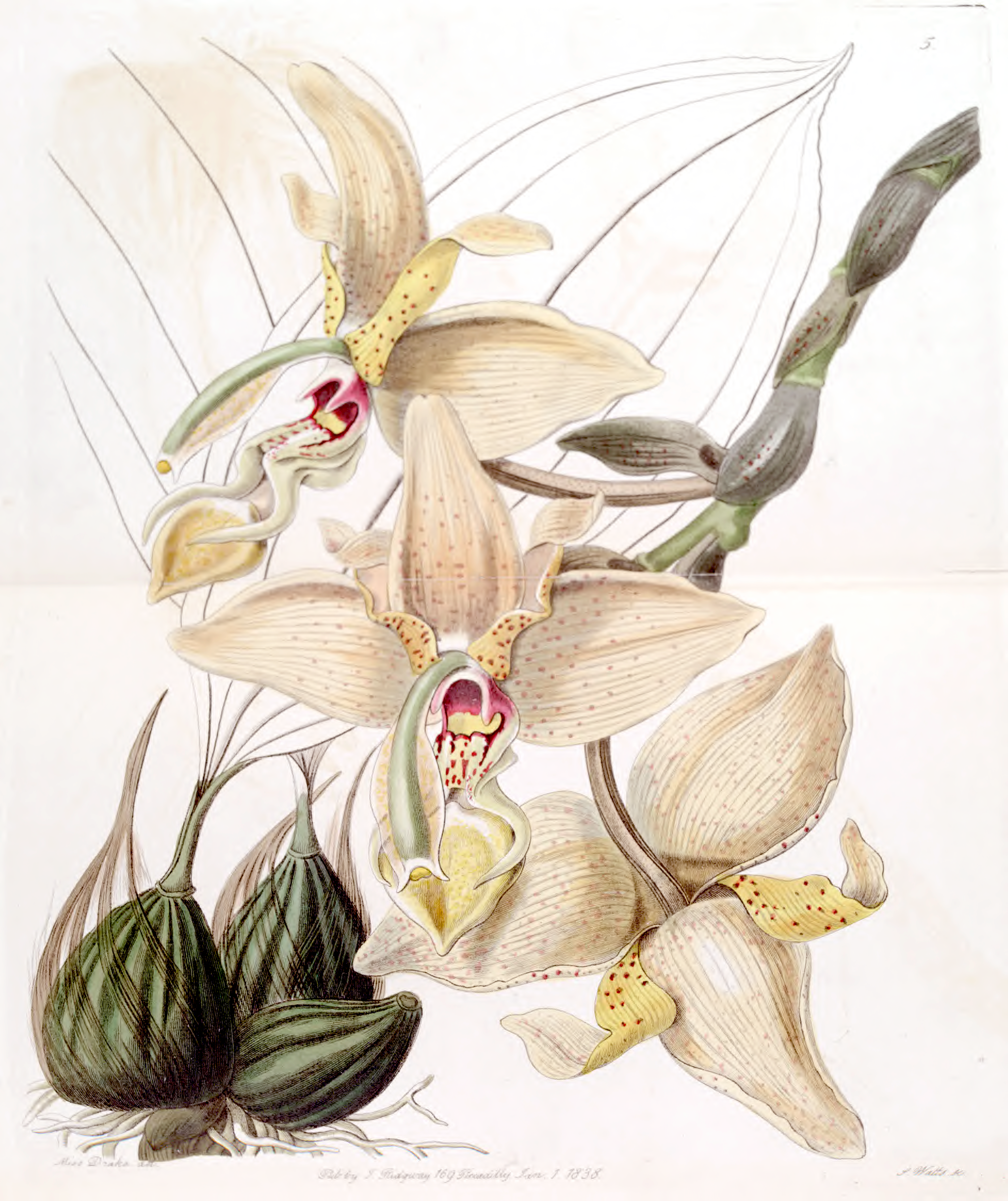
Stanhopea quadricornis

Disocactus speciosus as Cereus speciosissimus

== Books and magazines which contained her illustrations ==
- Sertum Orchidaceum
- Bateman, J. The Orchidology of Mexico and Guatemala (1837–1843)
- The Botany of H.M.S. Sulphur (1836 - 1842)
- Wallich, N. Plantae Asiaticae Rariores (1830 - 1832) (Volume 1, Volume 2, Volume 3 (note that the plates nominate the lithographer in all cases, and sometimes the various artists)
- J. Forbes Boyle (1833-1839) Illustrations of the Botany and other branches of the Natural History of the Himalayan Mountains (note that the plates nominate the lithographer in all cases, and sometimes the various artists)
- Edwards's Botanical Register
- Ladies' Botany

== Honours ==
Lindley named the Western Australian orchid genus, Drakaea, to honour her.

== See also ==
- Sarah Lindley Crease
