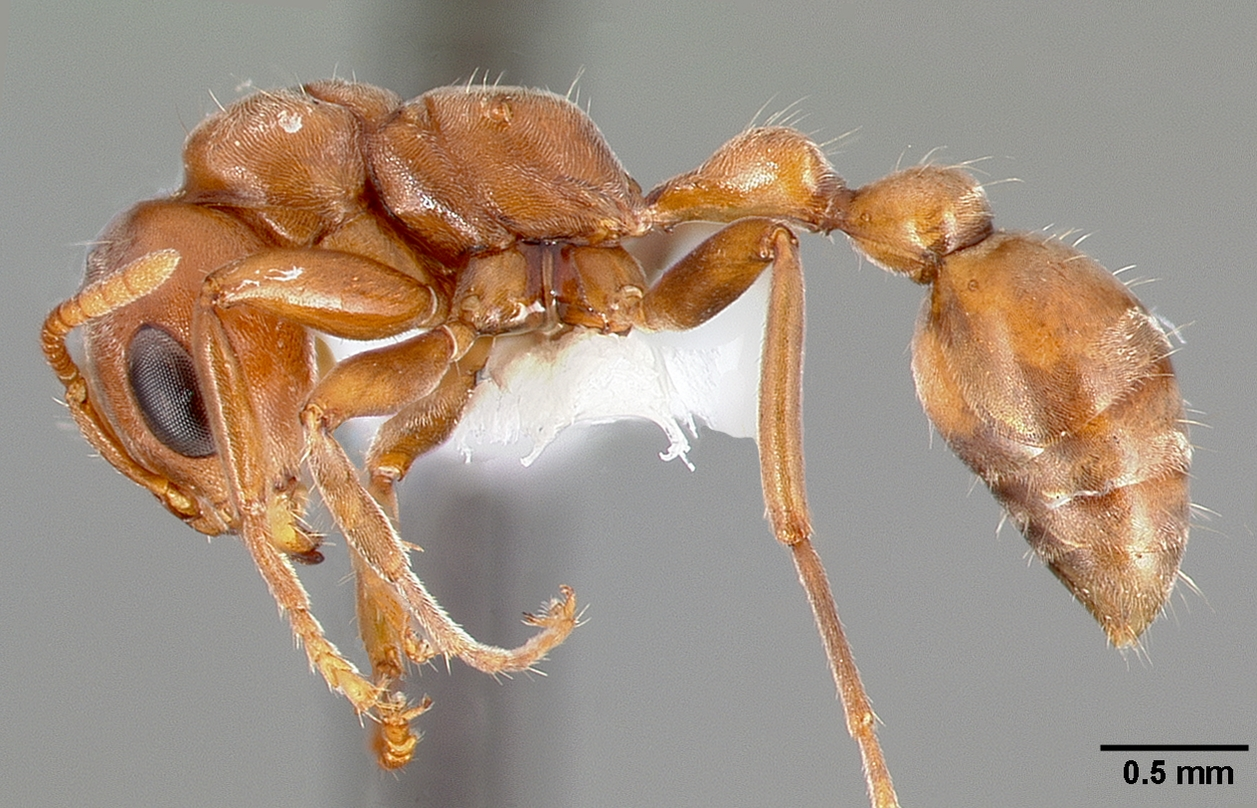
- Pseudomyrmex spinicola worker

Scientific classification
- Domain: Eukaryota
- Kingdom: Animalia
- Phylum: Arthropoda
- Class: Insecta
- Order: Hymenoptera
- Family: Formicidae
- Genus: Pseudomyrmex
- Species: P. spinicola

Binomial name
- Pseudomyrmex spinicola Emery, 1890

= Pseudomyrmex spinicola =

Species of ant

Pseudomyrmex spinicola is a species of red myrmecophyte-inhabiting neotropical ants which are found only in Nicaragua and Costa Rica. They live in the thorns of tropical trees like Acacia collinsii or Acacia allenii, feeding on nectaries along with the protein and lipid-rich beltian bodies. These bodies are named for Thomas Belt, a naturalist who first described the interactions between acacias and ants in his 1874 book Naturalist in Nicaragua. Belt's book in fact described ants of this species, then unknown.

P. spinicola are the more aggressive among a number of A. collinsii-inhabiting species that engage in a classic case of mutualism. The ants receive colony space in A. collinsii to support their population structure. In return, the ants actively defend the tree from herbivory and often from competing plants nearby, clearing the forest floor of other seedlings. Sometimes, a large P. spinicola colony may be spread between two or more trees, protecting each tree within their colony and possibly grooming A. collinsii seedlings within that microhabitat to be used by the colony.

Populations of mutualistic myrmecophyte-inhabiting ants may be space limited, and therefore P. spinicola use the largest-volume thorns for the queen's chamber and other large-volume thorns for egg nurseries. The smallest eggs will be found in the queen's chamber, before being redistributed to other larger thorns to be nursed through early life stages.

== Chemical Ecology ==
The symbiotic ants living on this tree become alarmed at tissue disruption of the plant’s leaves by herbivores like the scarab, Pelidnota punctulate. This beetle only feeds on ant-acacias and is protected by its heavy cuticle. Tissue disruption of the tree leaves releases trans-2-hexenal, a compound that ants detect as a kairomone. On exposure to test samples of this compound the ants become alarmed and displayed alarm behavior. This compound is not found in the mandibular gland secretions of Costa Rican acacia ants, that are likely to be the source of the ant’s alarm pheromones.
