= MiR172 microRNA precursor family =

miR172 microRNA precursor family
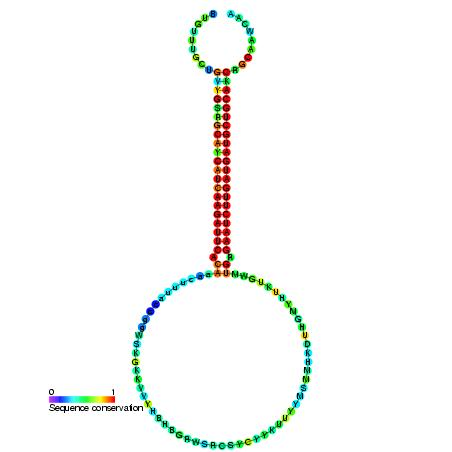
- Predicted secondary structure and sequence conservation of miR172

Identifiers
- Symbol: miR172
- Rfam: RF00452
- miRBase: MI0000215
- miRBase family: MIPF0000035

Other data
- RNA type: microRNA
- Domain: Viridiplantae
- GO: GO:0035195 GO:0035068
- SO: SO:0001244
- PDB structures: PDBe

miR172 is a conserved plant microRNA that regulates developmental timing and reproductive development by targeting transcripts encoding APETALA2-like transcription factors. Members of the miR172 family are widely conserved across flowering plants and act as key regulators of flowering time, phase transitions, and floral organ identity.

== Function ==
miR172 regulates plant development primarily by repressing members of the APETALA2 (AP2) family of transcription factors. In Arabidopsis thaliana, miR172 can bind with high complementarity to the messenger RNA of APETALA2 and inhibit its expression mainly through translational repression.

Overexpression of miR172 results in early flowering and defects in floral organ identity, consistent with reduced activity of AP2-like transcription factors that normally act as repressors of floral transition.

== Developmental phase transitions ==
miR172 plays a central role in developmental phase transitions in plants. In maize, accumulation of miR172 increases during shoot development and promotes the transition from juvenile to adult growth phases by downregulating the AP2-like gene glossy15.

In Arabidopsis and related species, miR172 functions in a regulatory network with another conserved plant microRNA, miR156. miR156 levels are high during early development and decline with plant age, allowing increased expression of SPL transcription factors that promote the accumulation of miR172. This sequential regulatory cascade coordinates age-dependent flowering responses and developmental timing.

== Roles in reproductive development ==
Beyond flowering time control, miR172 also contributes to reproductive development and floral patterning. In maize, the microRNA encoded by the tasselseed4 locus regulates sex determination and meristem cell fate by targeting AP2-like genes involved in spikelet development.

miR172 activity also influences fruit development. In Arabidopsis, regulatory interactions involving miR172 integrate developmental and hormonal signaling pathways to promote fruit growth.

== Evolution and conservation ==
The miR172 family is conserved across flowering plants and regulates diverse developmental processes through control of AP2-like transcription factors. Variation in the expression and regulatory interactions of miR172 contributes to differences in developmental timing and reproductive strategies among plant species.

== See also ==
- MicroRNA
- miR156 microRNA precursor family
