= MiR535 microRNA precursor family =

Short RNA molecule

miR535

Identifiers
- Symbol: miR535
- Rfam: RF00714
- miRBase family: MIPF0000136

Other data
- RNA type: microRNA
- Domain: Viridiplantae
- PDB structures: PDBe

In molecular biology, miR535 is a plant microRNA that regulates gene expression through sequence-directed cleavage or translational repression of target mRNAs. miR535 is evolutionarily related to the plant microRNAs miR156 and miR529, and members of these families commonly regulate genes encoding SQUAMOSA promoter-binding protein-like (SPL) transcription factors that control plant development.

In several plant species, including rice (Oryza sativa), miR535 targets SPL genes and participates in regulatory networks controlling plant architecture and reproductive development. Overexpression of miR535 in rice alters plant height, panicle architecture, and grain morphology, in part through repression of SPL transcription factors and downstream developmental regulators.

miR535 has also been implicated in plant immunity. In rice, miR535 regulates disease resistance against the fungal pathogen Magnaporthe oryzae by targeting the SPL transcription factor gene OsSPL4, thereby modulating defense-related gene expression and immune responses.

Together with miR156 and miR529, miR535 forms part of a group of related plant microRNAs that regulate SPL transcription factors and influence diverse developmental and physiological processes.

== See also ==
- MicroRNA
- miR156 microRNA precursor family
- miR529 microRNA precursor family
