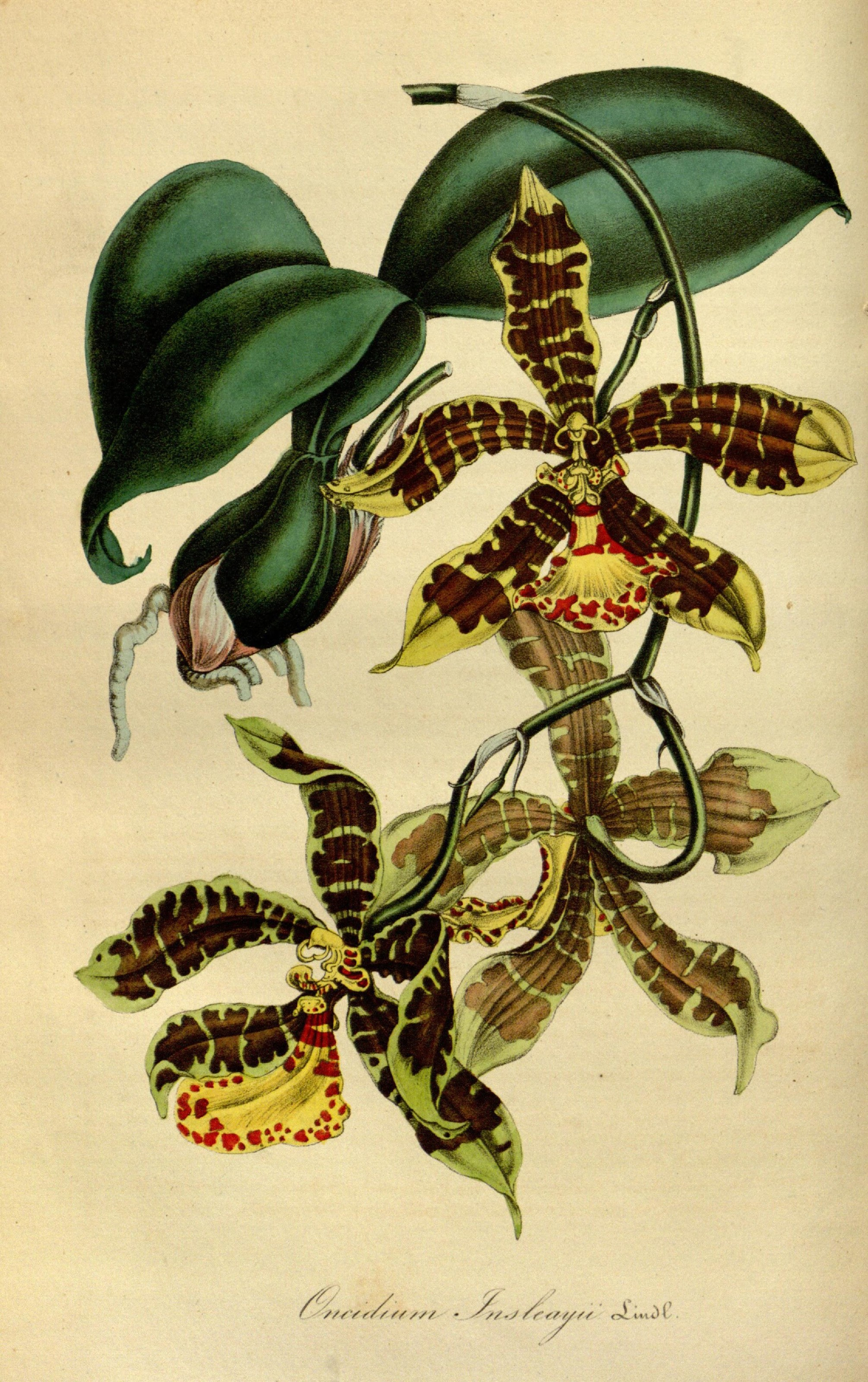

Scientific classification
- Kingdom: Plantae
- Clade: Tracheophytes
- Clade: Angiosperms
- Clade: Monocots
- Order: Asparagales
- Family: Orchidaceae
- Subfamily: Epidendroideae
- Genus: Rossioglossum
- Species: R. insleayi

Binomial name
- Rossioglossum insleayi (Baker ex Lindl.) Garay & G.C.Kenn.

Synonyms
- Odontoglossum insleayi (Baker ex Lindl.) Lindl. Odontoglossum insleayi var. aureum Rchb.f. ex B.S.Williams; Odontoglossum insleayi var. macranthum Lindl. Odontoglossum insleayi var. pantherinum Rchb.f. Oncidium insleayi Baker ex Lindl. Rossioglossum hagsaterianum f. aureum (Rchb.f. ex B.S.Williams) Christenson; Rossioglossum splendens var. leopardinum (Rchb.f.) Garay & G.C.Kenn. Rossioglossum splendens var. pantherinum (Rchb.f.) Garay & G.C.Kenn.

= Rossioglossum insleayi =

Species of plant

Rossioglossum insleayi is an epiphytic species of orchid native to Mexico, where it grows in the humid high oak/pine forests on the Pacific West/ It was first described by Baker in 1840, and in 1976 was assigned to the genus, Rossioglossum, by Garay and Kennedy.

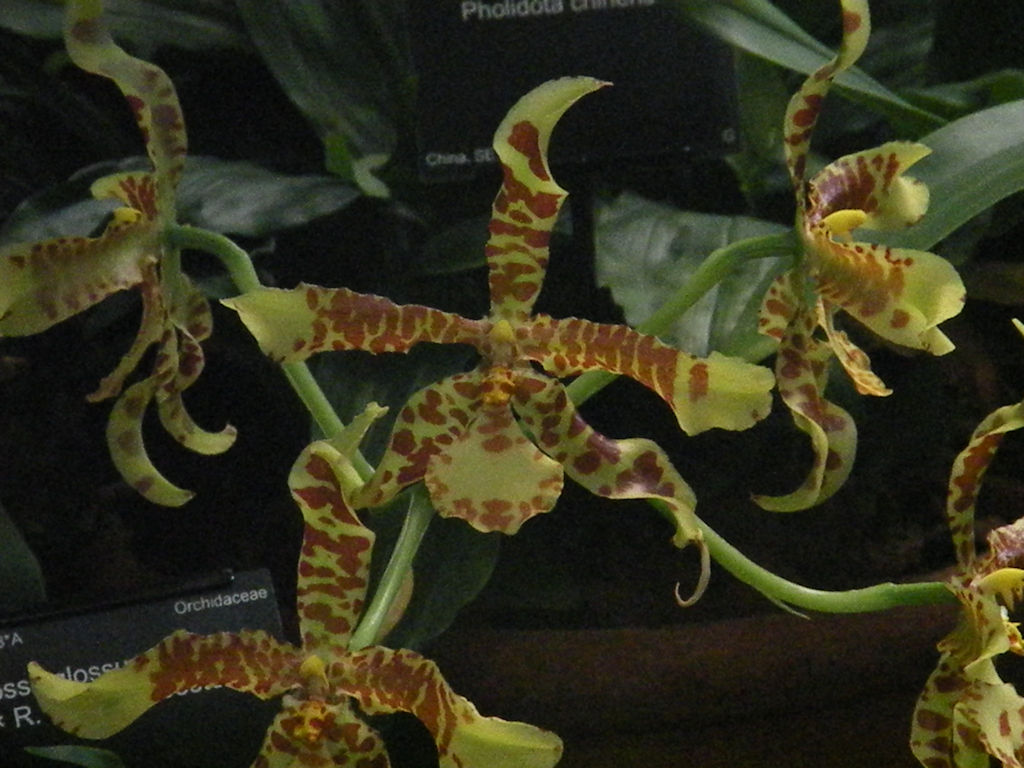
