= MiR390 microRNA precursor family =

miR390

Identifiers
- Symbol: miR390
- Rfam: RF00689
- miRBase family: MIPF0000101

Other data
- RNA type: microRNA
- Domain: Eukaryota;
- PDB structures: PDBe

The miR390 microRNA precursor family is a conserved plant microRNA family; mature miR390 is produced from MIR390 precursor transcripts. miR390 functions in the TAS3 trans-acting small interfering RNA pathway. miR390 is a conserved plant microRNA that directs the production of trans-acting siRNAs (ta-siRNAs) from TAS3 transcripts. In flowering plants, miR390 is loaded into ARGONAUTE7 and functions in the conserved miR390–TAS3–AUXIN RESPONSE FACTOR regulatory pathway, which helps control plant development including lateral root growth and aspects of leaf patterning.

== Function ==
miR390 is best known for its role in initiating ta-siRNA biogenesis from TAS3 precursor transcripts. In this pathway, miR390 binds to two target sites in TAS3, and this "two-hit" architecture is a defining feature of tasiRNA production from the TAS3 family. The resulting phased tasiRNAs regulate several AUXIN RESPONSE FACTOR genes, especially ARF3 and ARF4, linking miR390 to auxin-related developmental patterning.

== Biogenesis and mechanism ==
Like other plant microRNAs, miR390 is produced from a stem-loop precursor. Genetic analysis in Arabidopsis thaliana identified mutants defective in processing of the MIR390a precursor, supporting its formation through the canonical plant microRNA biogenesis pathway. Unlike many plant microRNAs, miR390 shows a specific association with ARGONAUTE7, an interaction required for normal TAS3 ta-siRNA formation. This specialized AGO7–miR390 module is a distinctive feature of the pathway.

== Biological roles ==
The miR390–TAS3 pathway has been implicated in several aspects of plant development. In Arabidopsis, auxin regulates this pathway during lateral root development, and quantitative changes in miR390 and TAS3 tasiRNAs affect lateral root growth. The pathway also contributes to developmental patterning in aerial tissues through regulation of ARF genes. Related components of the pathway have also been studied in maize, where an ARGONAUTE7-like protein is required for normal leaf expansion.

== Evolution and conservation ==
miR390 is one of the conserved plant microRNAs and is associated with a broadly conserved TAS3 tasiRNA pathway across land plants. This conservation has made miR390 an important model for studying the origin and diversification of small-RNA-guided regulatory networks in plants.

== See also ==
- MicroRNA
- Trans-acting siRNA
- TAS3
- ARGONAUTE7 (AGO7)
