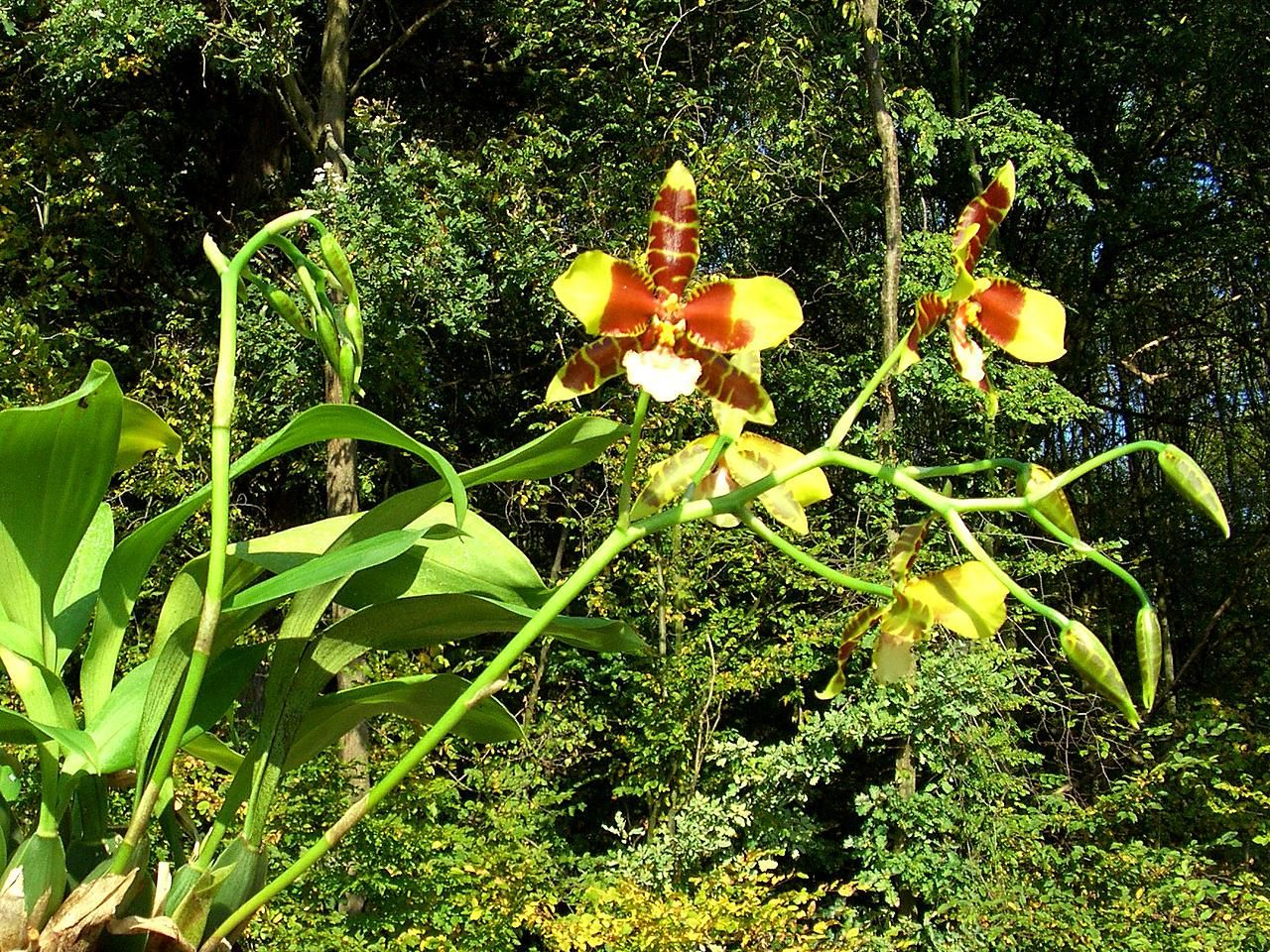

Scientific classification
- Kingdom: Plantae
- Clade: Tracheophytes
- Clade: Angiosperms
- Clade: Monocots
- Order: Asparagales
- Family: Orchidaceae
- Subfamily: Epidendroideae
- Genus: Rossioglossum
- Species: R. grande

Binomial name
- Rossioglossum grande (Lindl.) Garay & G.C.Kenn.

Synonyms
- Odontoglossum grande Lindl.; Odontoglossum grande var. aureum Stein; Rossioglossum grande var. aureum (Stein) Garay & G.C.Kenn.; Rossioglossum grande f. aureum (Stein) Christenson

= Rossioglossum grande =

Species of tiger orchid from Costa Rica

Rossioglossum grande, one of several species known as tiger orchids, is an epiphytic orchid native to the area from Chiapas to Costa Rica. The plant may grow four to eight flowers, each up to 13 inches in diameter. The flowers are a glossy bright golden yellow with brown barring. Larger petals are yellow with the lower half red-brown. The lip is white and sometimes flecked with red-brown. The pseudobulbs are gray-green in color, and grow from 4 to 10 cm, each with two leaves.

Rossioglossum grande prefers hot, wet summers and cool, dry winters. It mainly flowers in the winter.

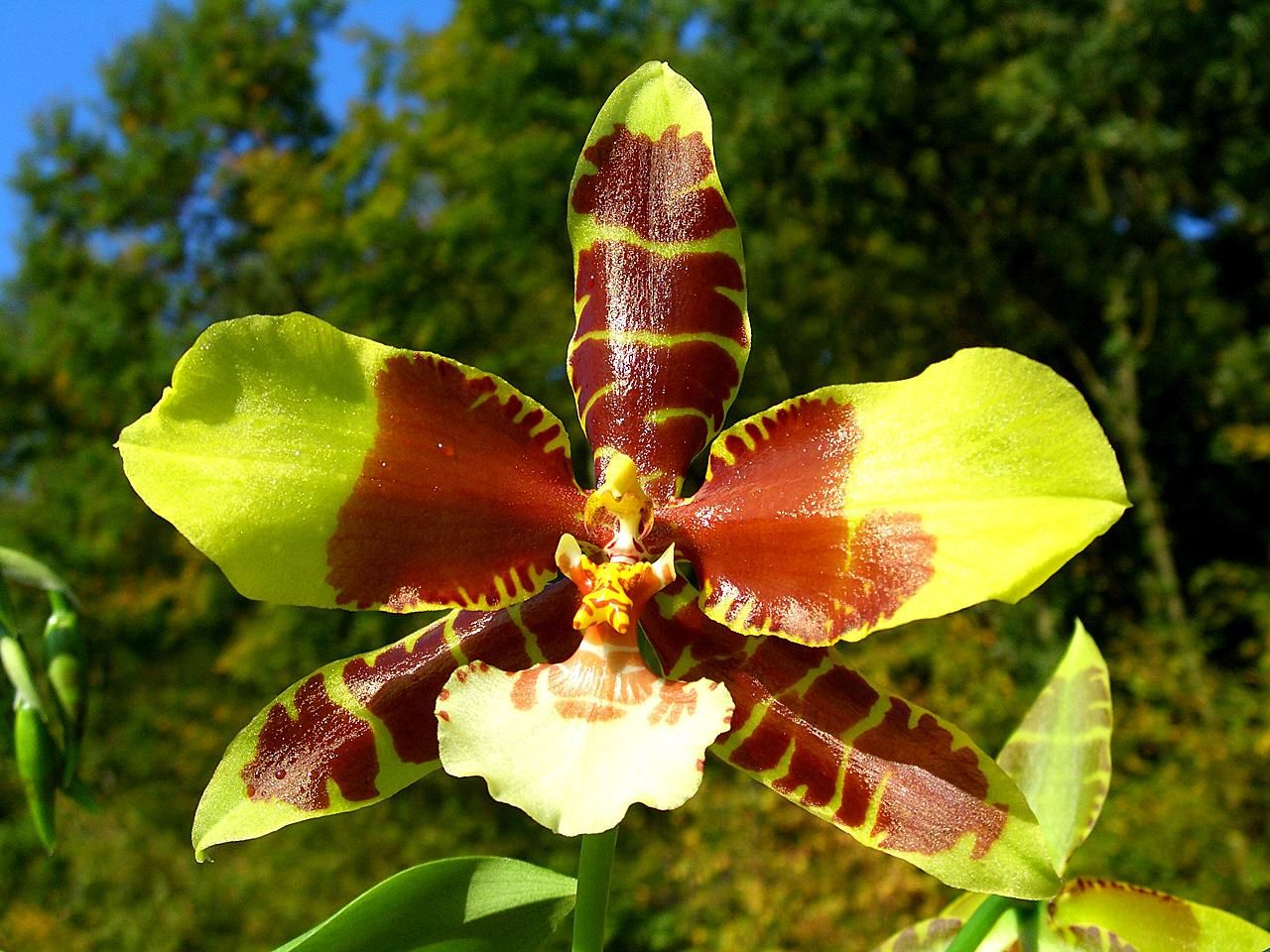
Tiger Orchid flower
