= MiR156 microRNA precursor family =

miR156 microRNA precursor
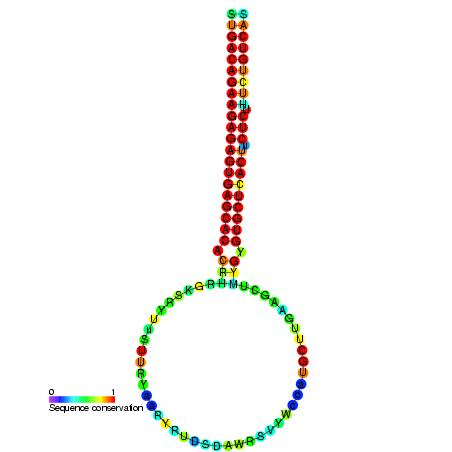
- Predicted secondary structure and sequence conservation of miR156

Identifiers
- Symbol: miR156
- Rfam: RF00073
- miRBase: MI0000178
- miRBase family: MIPF0000008

Other data
- RNA type: microRNA
- Domain: Viridiplantae
- GO: GO:0035195 GO:0035068
- SO: SO:0001244
- PDB structures: PDBe

In molecular biology, miR156 is a highly conserved plant microRNA that regulates gene expression through sequence-directed cleavage or translational repression of target mRNAs. In plants, miR156 is closely related to miR157, and the two are generally considered members of the miR156/157 microRNA family. The mature miR157 sequences differ from miR156 by only one to a few nucleotides and regulate many of the same target genes, primarily members of the SQUAMOSA PROMOTER BINDING PROTEIN-LIKE (SPL) transcription factor family. Although miR157 shares overlapping functions with miR156, differences in sequence and expression levels can lead to distinct regulatory effects on plant development.

Levels of miR156 are typically high during early plant development and decline with age. This decline allows increasing expression of SPL genes, which promote the transition from juvenile to adult developmental phases and eventually flowering.

== Function ==
miR156 regulates plant development primarily by repressing multiple SPL transcription factors. These SPL proteins control diverse developmental processes including vegetative phase change, flowering time, and organ development.

Experimental manipulation of the miR156–SPL pathway demonstrates its central role in developmental timing. In Arabidopsis thaliana, constitutive expression of miR156 prolongs juvenile vegetative traits and delays flowering, while increased SPL expression promotes adult development and reproductive competence.

== Interaction with other microRNAs ==
miR156 functions within a broader regulatory network involving additional microRNAs. In Arabidopsis, miR156 acts upstream of miR172 through regulation of SPL transcription factors such as SPL9 and SPL10. These SPL proteins activate transcription of miR172, producing a sequential regulatory cascade that controls the transition from juvenile to adult phases of shoot development.

In early-diverging land plants such as the moss Physcomitrella patens, miR156 also participates in small RNA regulatory networks involving miR390 and trans-acting small interfering RNAs (tasiRNAs), demonstrating that components of the developmental timing pathway are ancient and conserved.

== Additional biological roles ==
Beyond developmental timing, the miR156–SPL regulatory module also influences plant metabolism. In Arabidopsis, SPL transcription factors targeted by miR156 regulate the biosynthesis of anthocyanin pigments. Increased miR156 activity promotes anthocyanin accumulation, whereas reduced miR156 activity leads to increased flavonol production.

== Genetic studies in crops ==
Genetic studies in crop plants have demonstrated that miR156 can strongly influence plant architecture. In maize (Zea mays), the dominant mutant Corngrass1 results from overexpression of tandem miR156 genes.These plants retain juvenile traits during reproductive development and show altered developmental timing associated with changes in the miR156–miR172 regulatory balance.

== Evolution and conservation ==
miR156 is among the most deeply conserved plant microRNAs and has been identified throughout land plants. The miR156–SPL regulatory module appears to be an ancient developmental control system that predates the evolution of flowering plants.

== See also ==
- MicroRNA
- miR529
- miR535
