= Orchid Digest =

The Orchid Digest
- Language: English
- Edited by: Fred Missbach

Publication details
- Publisher: La Cañada, Calif., etc., Orchid Digest Corp. (United States of America)

Standard abbreviations
- ISO 4: Orchid Dig.

Indexing
- ISSN: 0199-9559
- OCLC no.: 1774027

Orchid Digest is a grower's magazine about orchidology aimed towards orchid enthusiasts.
