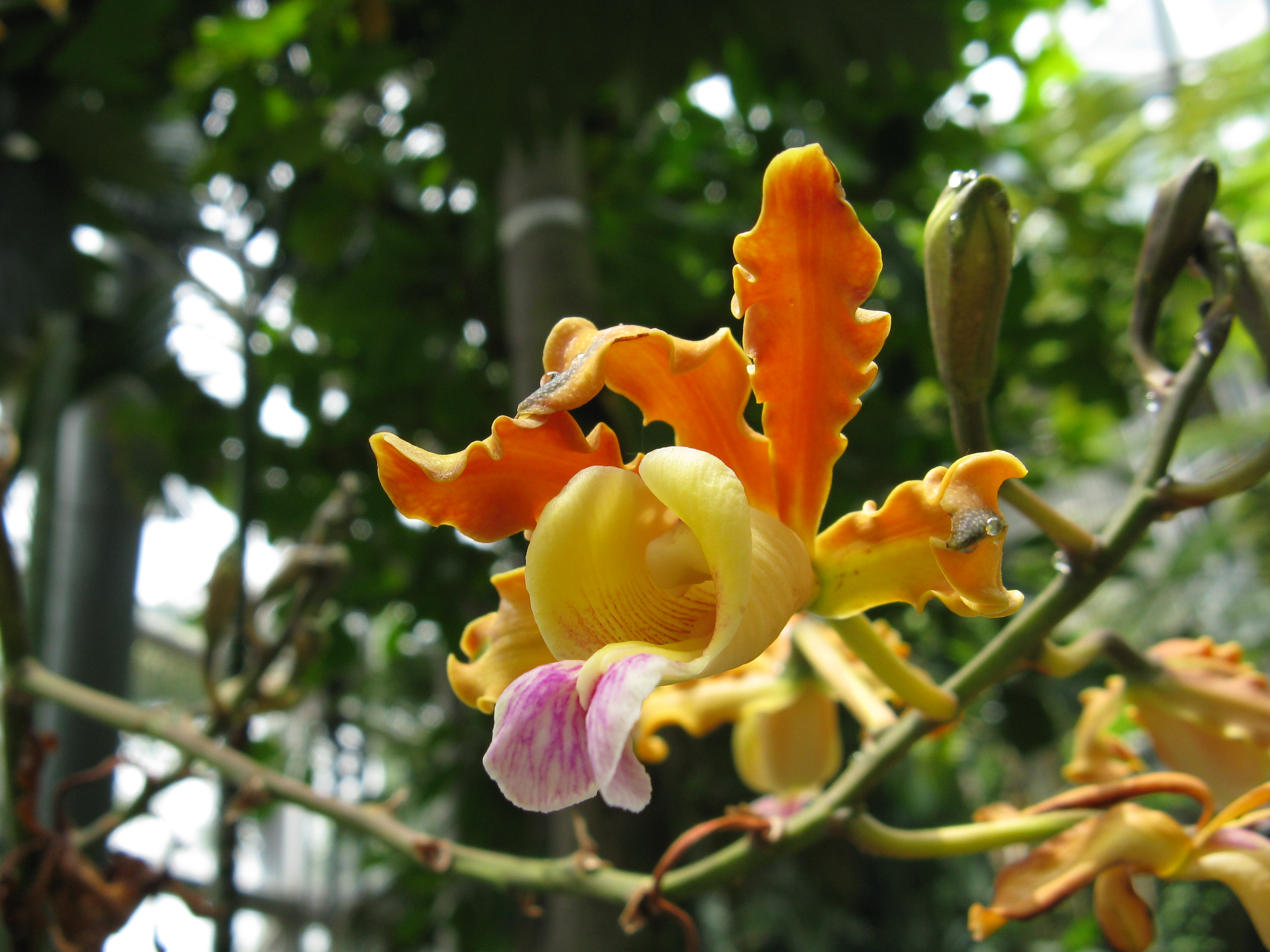

Scientific classification
- Kingdom: Plantae
- Clade: Tracheophytes
- Clade: Angiosperms
- Clade: Monocots
- Order: Asparagales
- Family: Orchidaceae
- Subfamily: Epidendroideae
- Genus: Myrmecophila
- Species: M. brysiana

Binomial name
- Myrmecophila brysiana (Lem.) G.C.Kenn., Orchid Digest 43: 210 (1979)

Synonyms
- Schomburgkia brysiana Lem., Jard. Fleur. 1(Misc.): 34 (1851).; Schomburgkia campecheana (Lem.) Kraenzl. 1903

= Myrmecophila brysiana =

Species of orchid

Myrmecophila brysiana is an orchid in the genus Myrmecophila. A common name for the species is Brys's schomburgkia. It was first described by Charles Antoine Lemaire in 1851.

It is found growing along rivers and seashores in dense mangroves in Central America (Belize, Costa Rica, Guatemala, Honduras, southeast Mexico and the southwest Caribbean). The flowers show significant variation and may indicate this is more than one species.
