= MiR529 microRNA precursor family =

Name of an RNA molecule

miR529

Identifiers
- Symbol: miR529
- Rfam: RF00908
- miRBase family: MIPF0000388

Other data
- RNA type: microRNA
- Domain: Viridiplantae
- PDB structures: PDBe

In molecular biology, miR529 is a plant microRNA that regulates gene expression through sequence-directed cleavage or translational repression of target mRNAs. miR529 is evolutionarily related to the conserved plant microRNA miR156, and both families regulate members of the SQUAMOSA promoter-binding protein-like (SPL) gene family.

The miR529 and miR156 families share overlapping target sites in several SPL genes, resulting in combinatorial regulation of plant developmental processes. Phylogenetic analyses indicate that many miR529 targets derive from a subset of SPL genes that are also regulated by miR156, suggesting that the two microRNA families cooperate to control the evolution and functional diversification of SPL transcription factors.

Evolutionary analyses suggest that miR529 arose early in land plant evolution but has been lost in several plant lineages, including many core eudicots such as Arabidopsis thaliana. In species lacking miR529, regulatory functions associated with this microRNA may be partially compensated by members of the miR156 family.

Functional studies in crops such as rice have shown that miR156 and miR529 regulate plant architecture and reproductive development by controlling SPL gene expression. In rice, the two microRNAs exhibit distinct expression patterns, with miR156 acting mainly during vegetative development and miR529 functioning more prominently in reproductive tissues such as the panicle.

== See also ==
- MicroRNA
- miR156 microRNA precursor family
