= List of Pseudomyrmex species =

This is a list of extant valid species and subspecies of the ant genus Pseudomyrmex. There are 146 species in this genus.

== A ==
- Pseudomyrmex acanthobius (Emery, 1896)
- Pseudomyrmex adustus (Borgmeier, 1929)
- Pseudomyrmex alternans (Santschi, 1936)
- Pseudomyrmex alustratus Ward, 1989
- Pseudomyrmex alvarengai Kempf, 1961
- Pseudomyrmex antiguanus (Enzmann, 1944)
- Pseudomyrmex antiquus Ward, 1992
- Pseudomyrmex apache Creighton, 1953
- Pseudomyrmex atripes (Smith, 1860)
- Pseudomyrmex avitus Ward, 1992

== B ==
- Pseudomyrmex baros Ward, 1992
- Pseudomyrmex beccarii (Menozzi, 1935)
- Pseudomyrmex boopis (Roger, 1863)
- Pseudomyrmex browni Kempf, 1967
- Pseudomyrmex brunneus (Smith, 1877)

== C ==
- Pseudomyrmex caeciliae (Forel, 1913)
- Pseudomyrmex championi (Forel, 1899)
- Pseudomyrmex cladoicus (Smith, 1858)
- Pseudomyrmex colei (Enzmann, 1944)
- Pseudomyrmex concolor (Smith, 1860)
- Pseudomyrmex coronatus (Wheeler, 1942)
- Pseudomyrmex coruscus Ward, 1992
- Pseudomyrmex cretus Ward, 1989
- Pseudomyrmex cubaensis (Forel, 1901)
- Pseudomyrmex curacaensis (Forel, 1912)

== D ==
- Pseudomyrmex dendroicus (Forel, 1904)
- Pseudomyrmex denticollis (Emery, 1890)
- Pseudomyrmex depressus (Forel, 1906)
- Pseudomyrmex distinctus (Smith, 1877)
- Pseudomyrmex duckei (Forel, 1906)

== E ==
- Pseudomyrmex eduardi (Forel, 1912)
- Pseudomyrmex ejectus (Smith, 1858)
- Pseudomyrmex elongatulus (Dalla Torre, 1892)
- Pseudomyrmex elongatus (Mayr, 1870)
- Pseudomyrmex endophytus (Forel, 1912)
- Pseudomyrmex ethicus (Forel, 1911)
- Pseudomyrmex euryblemma (Forel, 1899)
- Pseudomyrmex excisus (Mayr, 1870)
- Pseudomyrmex extinctus (Carpenter, 1930)

== F ==
- Pseudomyrmex faber (Smith, 1858)
- Pseudomyrmex ferrugineus (Smith, 1877)
- Pseudomyrmex fervidus (Smith, 1877)
- Pseudomyrmex fiebrigi (Forel, 1908)
- Pseudomyrmex filiformis (Fabricius, 1804)
- Pseudomyrmex flavicornis (Smith, 1877)
- Pseudomyrmex flavidulus (Smith, 1858)

== G ==
- Pseudomyrmex gebellii (Forel, 1899)
- Pseudomyrmex gibbinotus (Forel, 1908)
- Pseudomyrmex godmani (Forel, 1899)
- Pseudomyrmex goeldii (Forel, 1912)
- Pseudomyrmex gracilis (Fabricius, 1804)

== H ==
- Pseudomyrmex haytianus (Forel, 1901)
- Pseudomyrmex hesperius Ward, 1993
- Pseudomyrmex holmgreni (Wheeler, 1925)

== I ==
- Pseudomyrmex incurrens (Forel, 1912)
- Pseudomyrmex ita (Forel, 1906)

== J ==
- Pseudomyrmex janzeni Ward, 1993

== K ==
- Pseudomyrmex kuenckeli (Emery, 1890)

== L ==
- Pseudomyrmex laevifrons Ward, 1989
- Pseudomyrmex laevigatus (Smith, 1877)
- Pseudomyrmex laevivertex (Forel, 1906)
- Pseudomyrmex leptosus Ward, 1985
- Pseudomyrmex lynceus (Spinola, 1851)

== M ==
- Pseudomyrmex macrops Ward, 1992
- Pseudomyrmex maculatus (Smith, 1855)
- Pseudomyrmex major (Forel, 1899)
- Pseudomyrmex malignus (Wheeler, 1921)
- Pseudomyrmex mandibularis (Spinola, 1851)
- Pseudomyrmex mixtecus Ward, 1993
- Pseudomyrmex monochrous (Dalla Torre, 1892)

== N ==
- Pseudomyrmex nexilis Ward, 1992
- Pseudomyrmex niger (Donisthorpe, 1940)
- Pseudomyrmex nigrescens (Forel, 1904)
- Pseudomyrmex nigrocinctus (Emery, 1890)
- Pseudomyrmex nigropilosus (Emery, 1890)

== O ==
- Pseudomyrmex oculatus (Smith, 1855)
- Pseudomyrmex oki (Forel, 1906)
- Pseudomyrmex opaciceps Ward, 1993
- Pseudomyrmex opacior (Forel, 1904)
- Pseudomyrmex oryctus Ward, 1992
- Pseudomyrmex osurus (Forel, 1911)

== P ==
- Pseudomyrmex pallens (Mayr, 1870)
- Pseudomyrmex pallidus (Smith, 1855)
- Pseudomyrmex particeps Ward, 1993
- Pseudomyrmex pazosi (Santschi, 1909)
- Pseudomyrmex peperi (Forel, 1913)
- Pseudomyrmex perboscii (Guerin-Meneville, 1844)
- Pseudomyrmex peruvianus (Wheeler, 1925)
- Pseudomyrmex phyllophilus (Smith, 1858)
- Pseudomyrmex pictus (Stitz, 1913)
- Pseudomyrmex pisinnus Ward, 1989
- Pseudomyrmex prioris Ward, 1992
- Pseudomyrmex pupa (Forel, 1911)

== R ==
- Pseudomyrmex reconditus Ward, 1993
- Pseudomyrmex rochai (Forel, 1912)
- Pseudomyrmex rufiventris (Forel, 1911)
- Pseudomyrmex rufomedius (Smith, 1877)

== S ==
- Pseudomyrmex salvini (Forel, 1899)
- Pseudomyrmex santschii (Enzmann, 1944)
- Pseudomyrmex satanicus (Wheeler, 1942)
- †Pseudomyrmex saxulum LaPolla & Greenwalt, 2015
- Pseudomyrmex schuppi (Forel, 1901)
- Pseudomyrmex seminole Ward, 1985
- Pseudomyrmex sericeus (Mayr, 1870)
- Pseudomyrmex simplex (Smith, 1877)
- Pseudomyrmex simulans Kempf, 1958
- Pseudomyrmex solisi (Santschi, 1916)
- Pseudomyrmex spiculus Ward, 1989
- Pseudomyrmex spinicola (Emery, 1890)
- Pseudomyrmex squamifer (Emery, 1890)
- Pseudomyrmex subater (Wheeler, 1914)
- Pseudomyrmex subtilissimus (Emery, 1890)
- Pseudomyrmex succinus Ward, 1992

== T ==
- Pseudomyrmex tachigaliae (Forel, 1904)
- Pseudomyrmex tenuis (Fabricius, 1804)
- Pseudomyrmex tenuissimus (Emery, 1906)
- Pseudomyrmex terminalis (Smith, 1877)
- Pseudomyrmex termitarius (Smith, 1855)
- Pseudomyrmex thecolor Ward, 1992
- Pseudomyrmex triplaridis (Forel, 1904)
- Pseudomyrmex triplarinus (Weddell, 1850)

== U ==
- Pseudomyrmex unicolor (Smith, 1855)
- Pseudomyrmex urbanus (Smith, 1877)

== V ==
- Pseudomyrmex veneficus (Wheeler, 1942)
- Pseudomyrmex venustus (Smith, 1858)
- †Pseudomyrmex vicinus Ward, 1992
- Pseudomyrmex viduus (Smith, 1858)
- Pseudomyrmex villosus Ward, 1989
- Pseudomyrmex voytowskii (Enzmann, 1944)

== W ==
- Pseudomyrmex weberi (Enzmann, 1944)
- Pseudomyrmex wheeleri (Enzmann, 1944)
