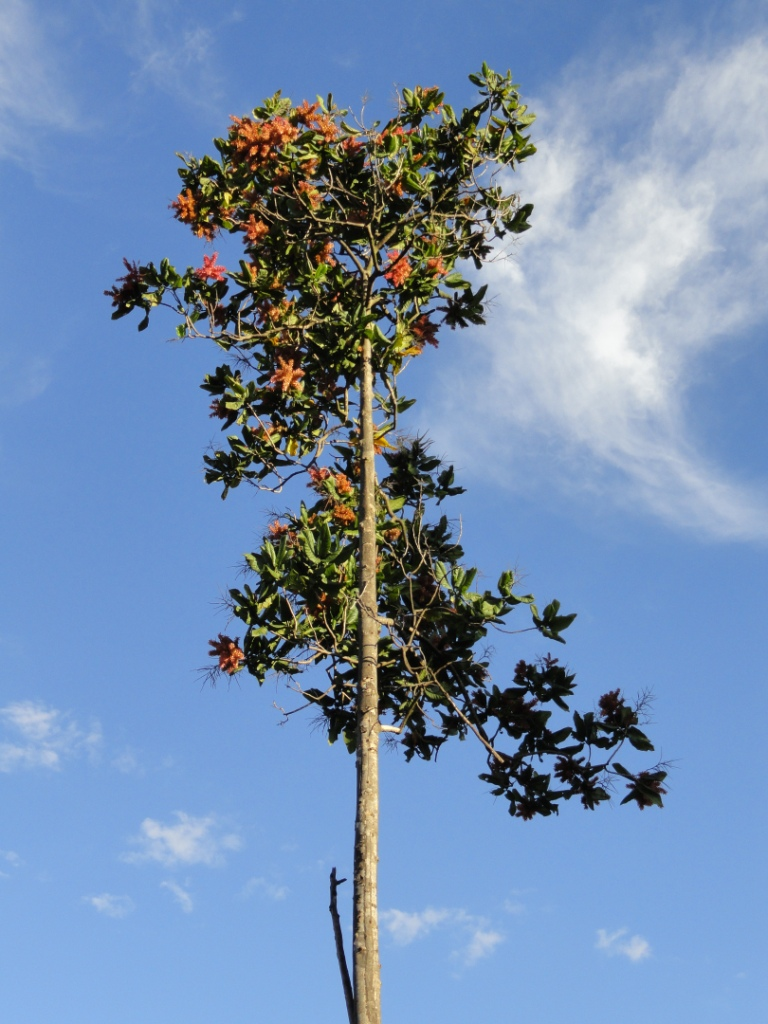

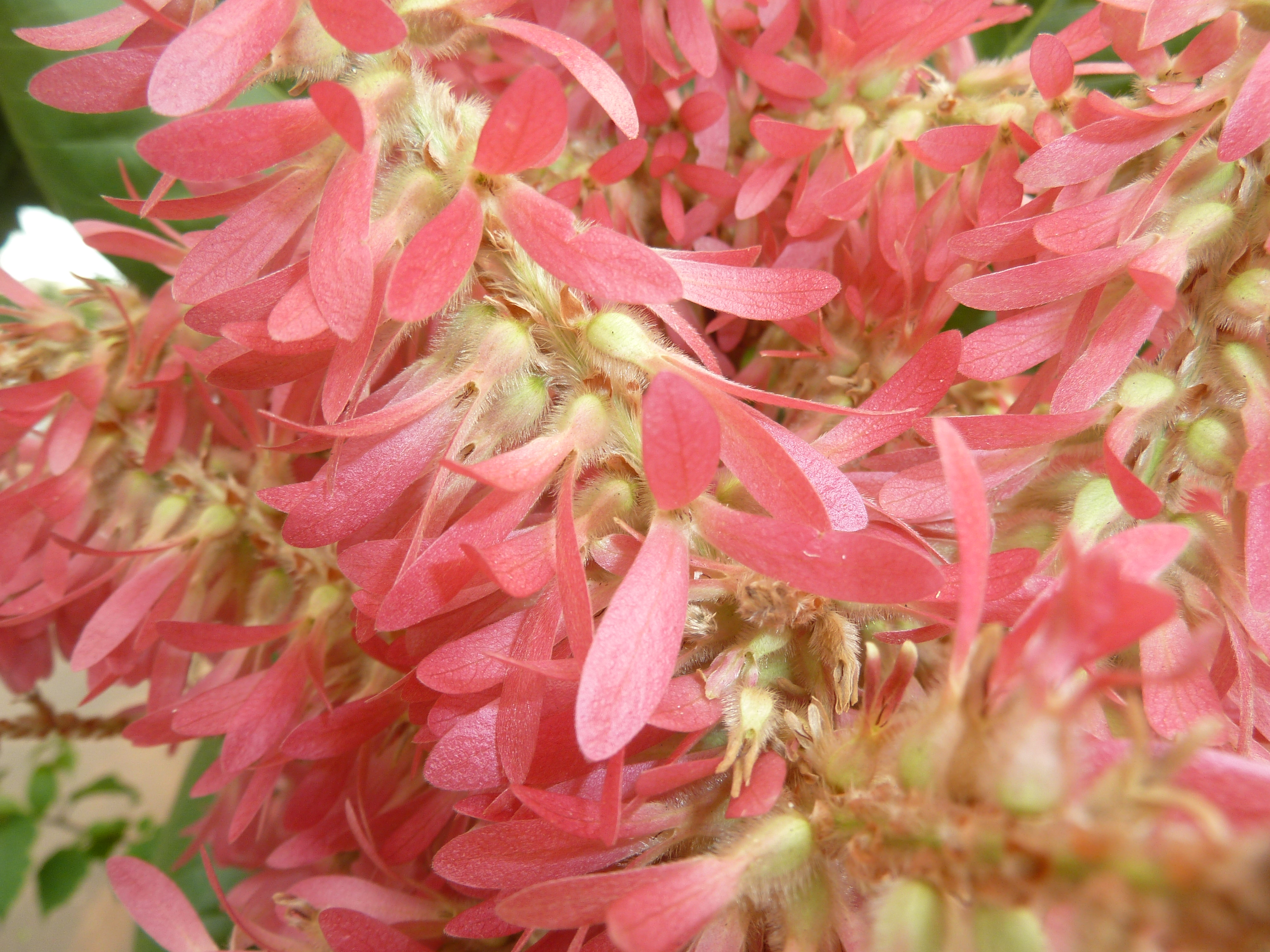
- female flowers

Scientific classification
- Kingdom: Plantae
- Clade: Tracheophytes
- Clade: Angiosperms
- Clade: Eudicots
- Order: Caryophyllales
- Family: Polygonaceae
- Genus: Triplaris
- Species: T. americana

Binomial name
- Triplaris americana L.

= Triplaris americana =

Ant tree

Species of tree

Triplaris americana is a species of flowering plant in the knotweed family known by many common names, including ant tree or pau-formiga ("ant tree"), guacamayo, guayabo zancón, hormiguero, palo de Santa María, tachí, vara santa, pau-de-novato, formigueiro, taxizeiro, and devil tree. It is native to Central and South America, occurring from Panama to Brazil. It is also cultivated as an ornamental for its showy pink flowers.

The ant tree grows up to 30 meters in height, with a trunk up to 30 centimeters in diameter and ochrea up to 12 centimeters in length. Its smooth bark is a mottled gray color. The leaves are oval to oblong and measure up to 40 centimeters long by 20 wide, with undersides that are sometimes woolly with brown fibers. The male flowers are around 2 millimeters long, while the female flowers are up to 5 centimeters long. This tree is dioecious, and has a skewed sex ratio with many more female plants than male.

This tree grows in riparian habitat types, and is a colonizer of disturbed habitat. It has been introduced to areas outside its native range, including Hawaii and southern Africa.

This species of tree is a myrmecophyte and it has a mutualistic relationship with ants, including Pseudomyrmex triplarinus. This kind of ant lives within the tree, feeding on substances produced by it and defending it against invaders. This tree is known as a "novice tree" (pau-de-novato) because only one unfamiliar with the tree would touch it, soon discovering that the ants are aggressive and venomous.

This tree is considered a noxious weed in southern Africa. The fruits are dispersed on the wind and the seedlings easily take hold and become invasive, growing in the local habitat and displacing native plants.
