= Pseudomyrmex triplarinus =

Scientific classification
- Domain: Eukaryota
- Kingdom: Animalia
- Phylum: Arthropoda
- Class: Insecta
- Order: Hymenoptera
- Family: Formicidae
- Genus: Pseudomyrmex
- Species: P. triplarinus

Binomial name
- Pseudomyrmex triplarinus (Weddell, 1850)

Species of ant

Pseudomyrmex triplarinus is a venomous species of ant that lives in symbiosis with trees of the genus Triplaris, including the South American species T. americana, T. cumingiama, and T. felipensis. The ant protects the trees against predation by other insects and animals. The ant's venom has anti-inflammatory properties.
