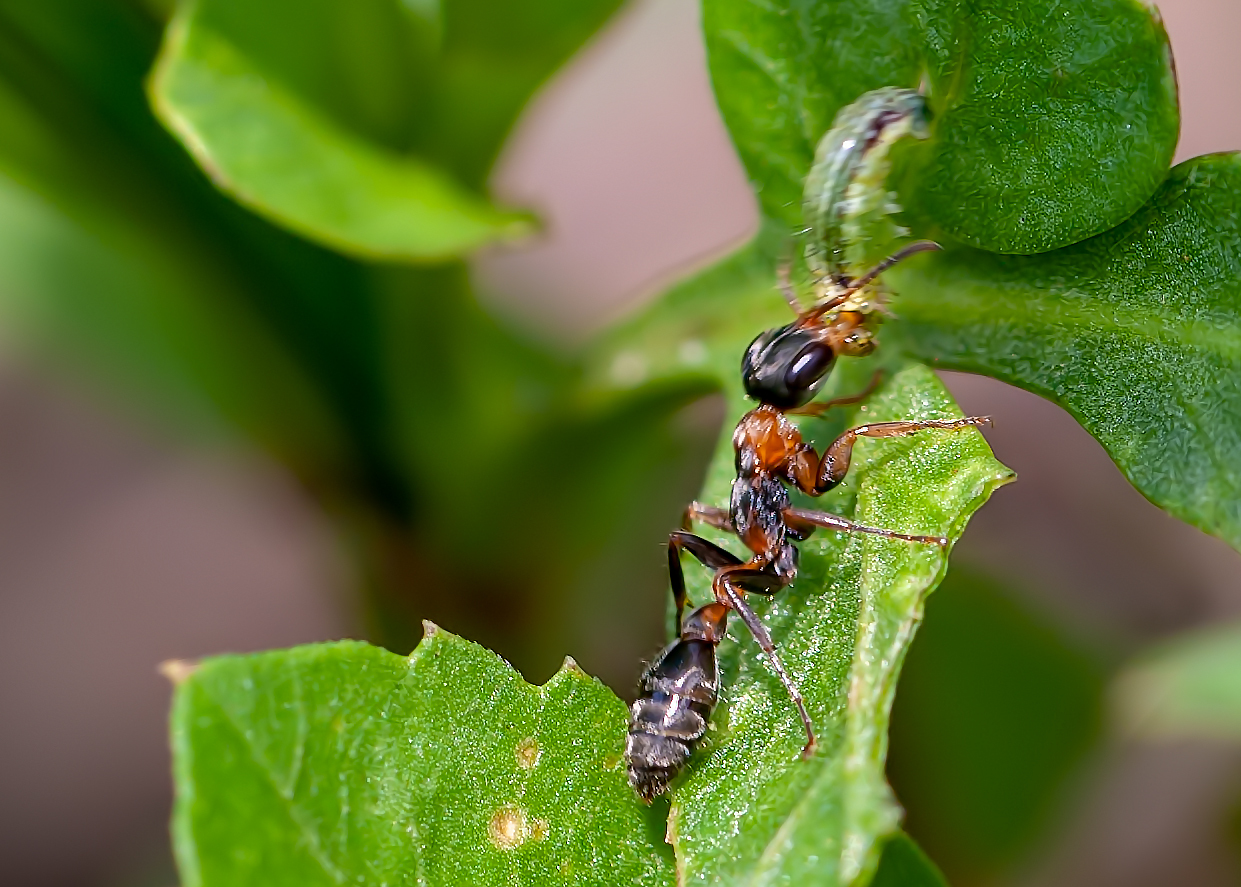
- P. gracilis (elongate twig ant) with caterpillar prey

Scientific classification
- Kingdom: Animalia
- Phylum: Arthropoda
- Class: Insecta
- Order: Hymenoptera
- Family: Formicidae
- Subfamily: Pseudomyrmecinae
- Tribe: Pseudomyrmecini
- Genus: Pseudomyrmex; Lund, 1831

Type species
- Formica gracilis Fabricius, 1804

Diversity
- 146 species

Synonyms
- Apedunculata Enzmann, 1944; Clavanoda Enzmann, 1944; Latinoda Enzmann, 1944; Leptalea Erichson, 1839; Myrmex Guérin-Méneville, 1844; Ornatinoda Enzmann, 1944; Pseudomyrma Guérin-Méneville, 1844; Triangulinoda Enzmann, 1944

= Pseudomyrmex =

Genus of ants

Pseudomyrmex is a genus of stinging, wasp-like ants in the subfamily Pseudomyrmecinae. They are large-eyed, slender ants, found mainly in tropical and subtropical regions of the New World.

== Distribution and habitat ==
Pseudomyrmex is predominantly Neotropical in distribution, but a few species are known from the Nearctic region. Most species are generalist twig nesters, for instance, Pseudomyrmex pallidus may nest in the hollow stems of dead grasses, twigs of herbaceous plants, and in dead, woody twigs. However, the genus is best known for several species that are obligate mutualists with certain species of Acacia. Other species have evolved obligate mutualism with other trees; for example Pseudomyrmex triplarinus is obligately dependent on any of a few trees in the genus Triplaris.

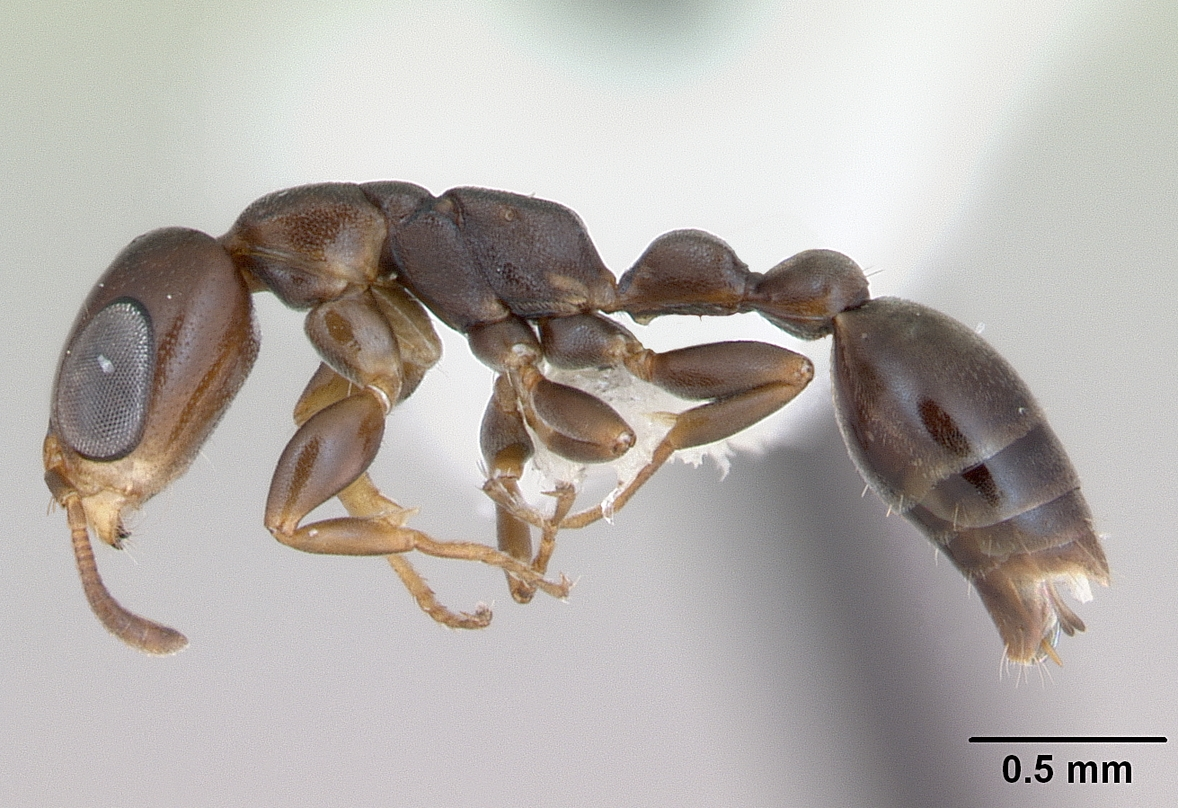
P. acanthobius

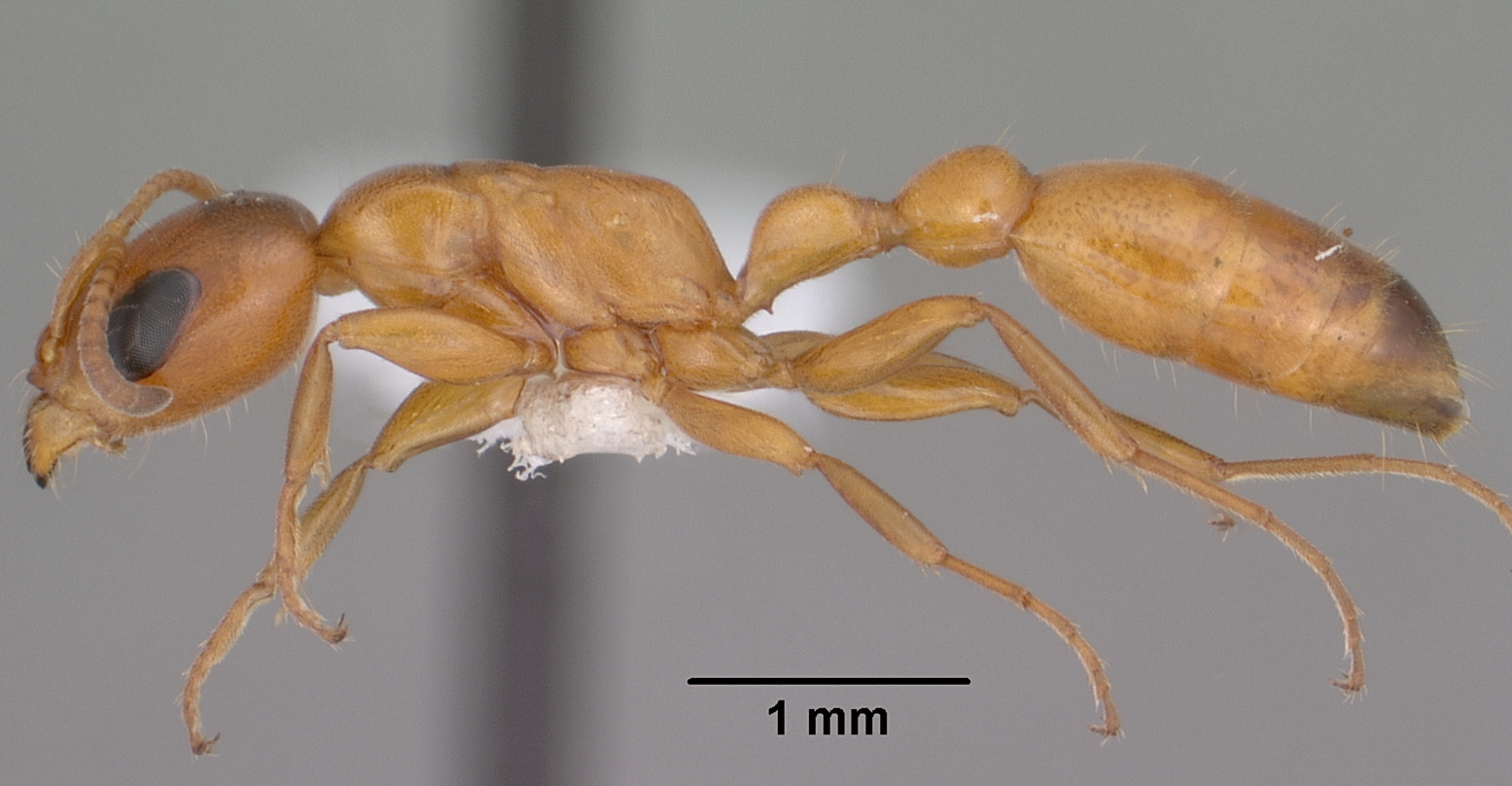
P. apache

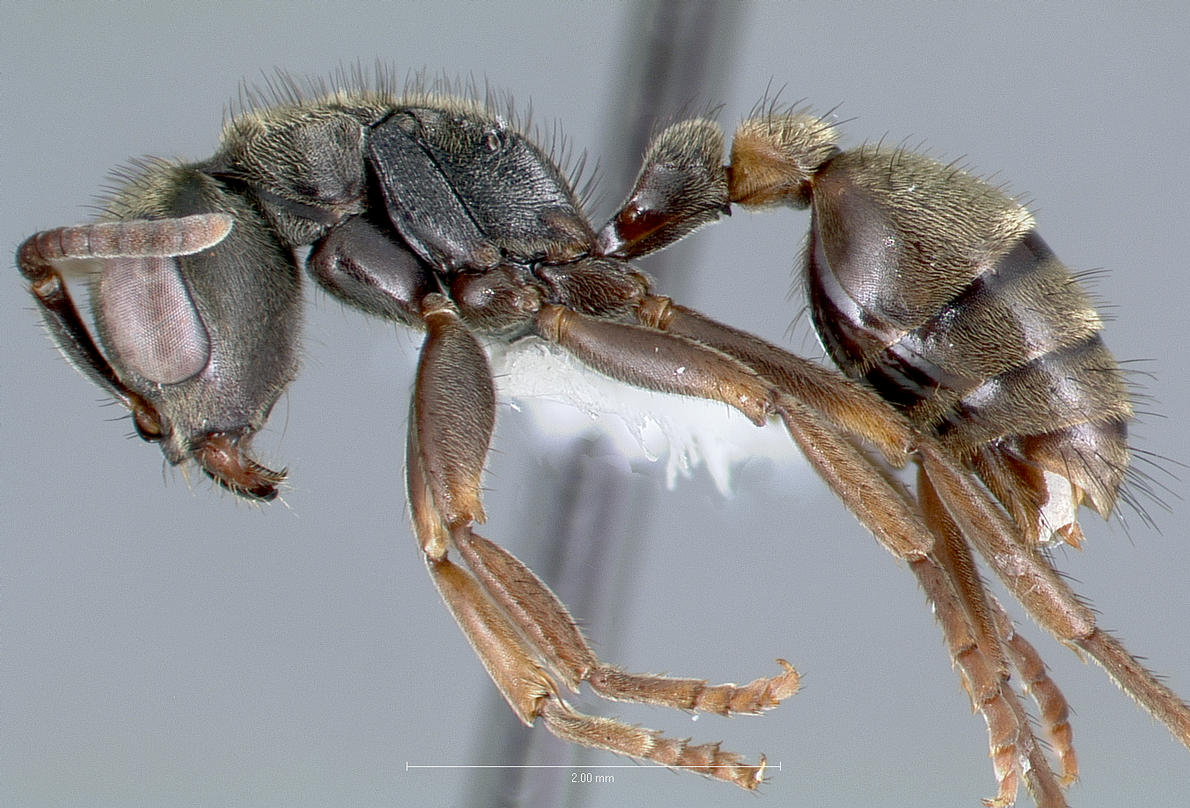
P. browni

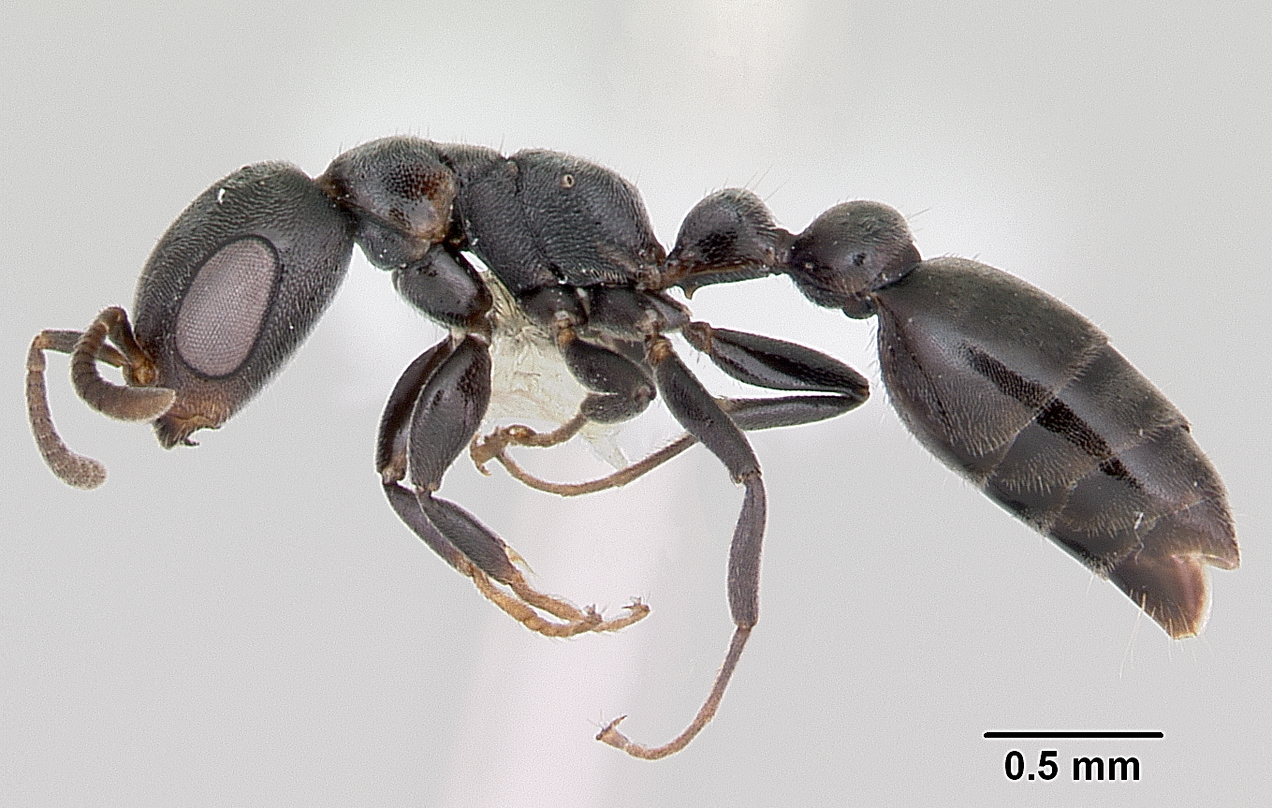
P. caeciliae

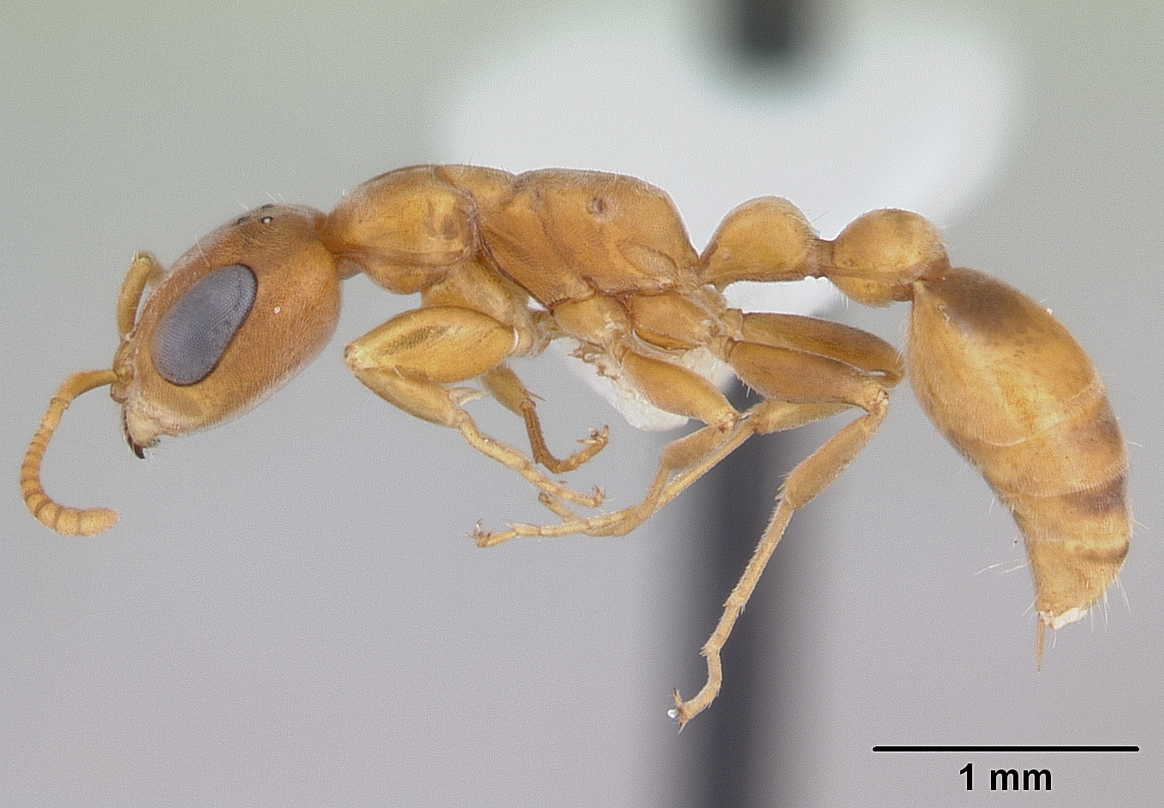
P. cubaensis

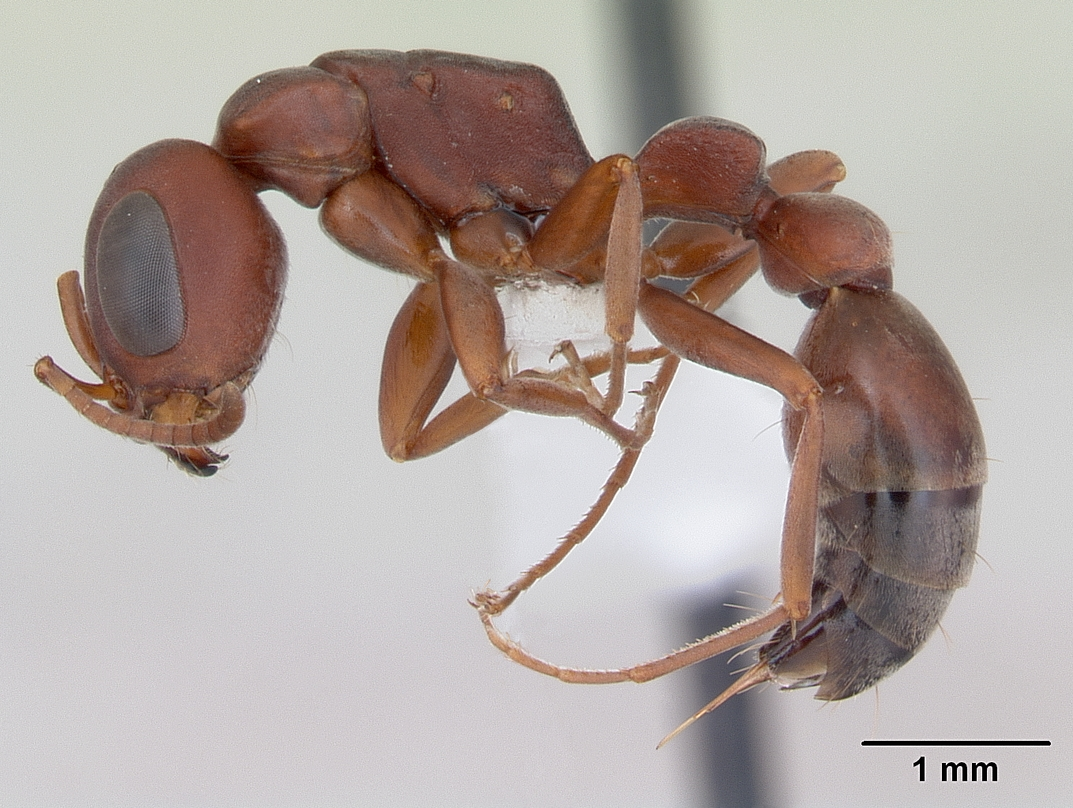
P. denticollis

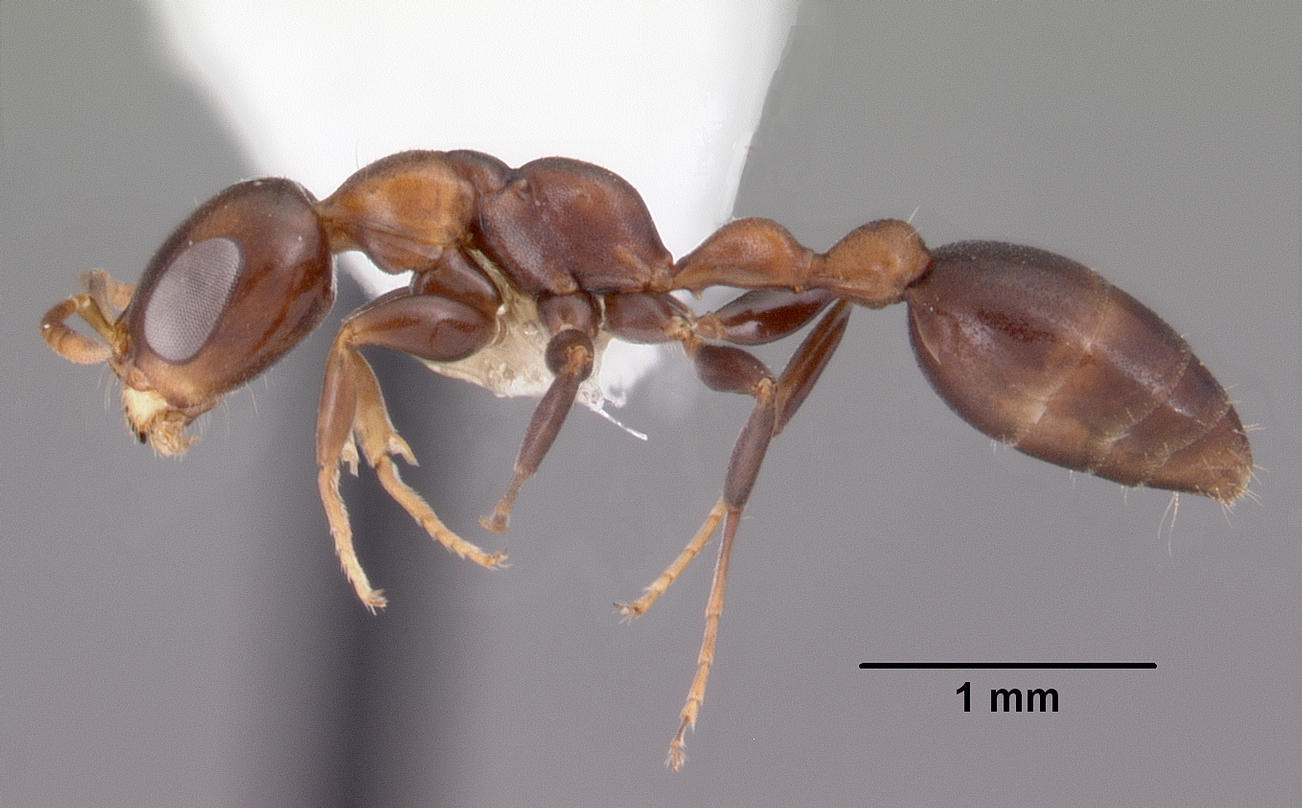
P. ejectus

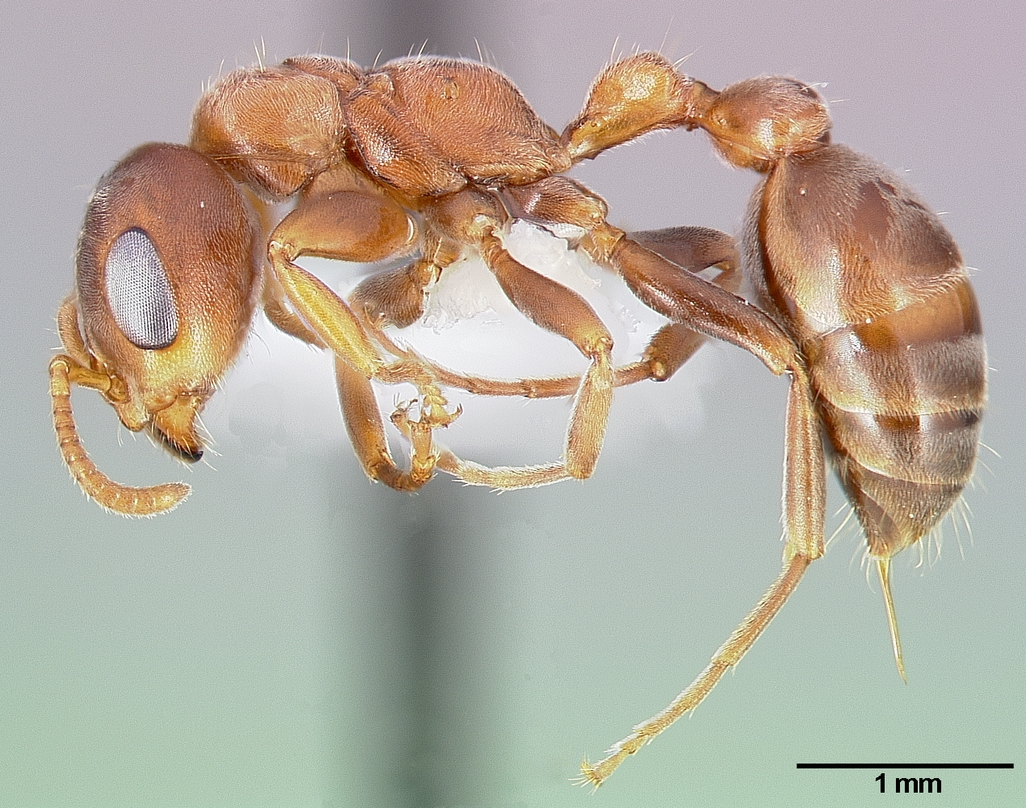
P. ferrugineus

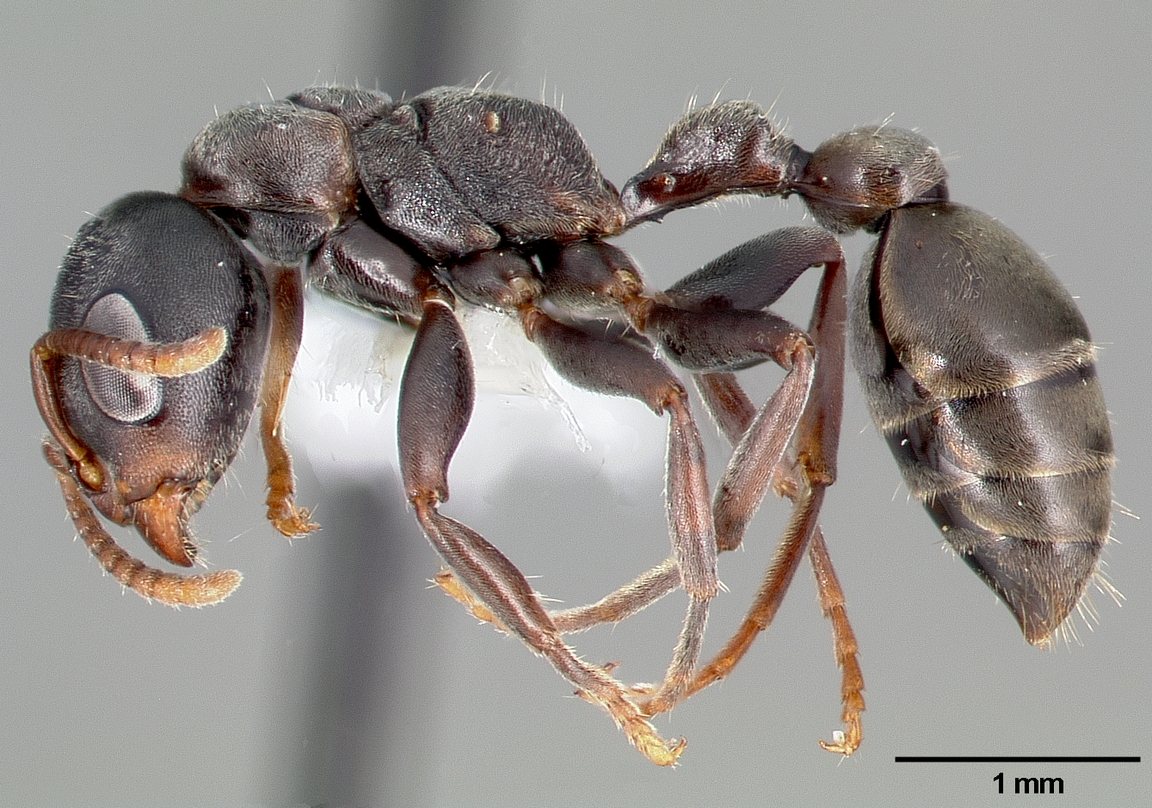
P. flavicornis

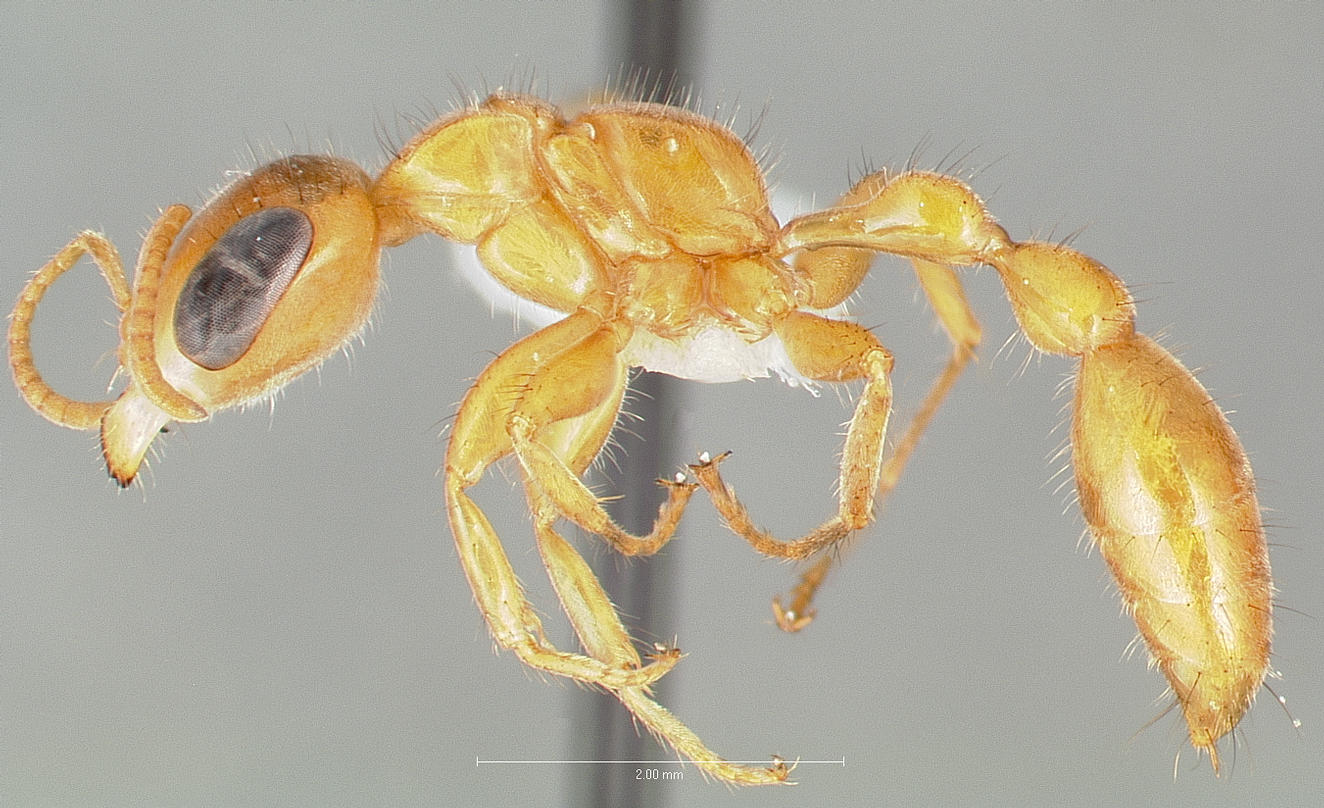
P. osurus

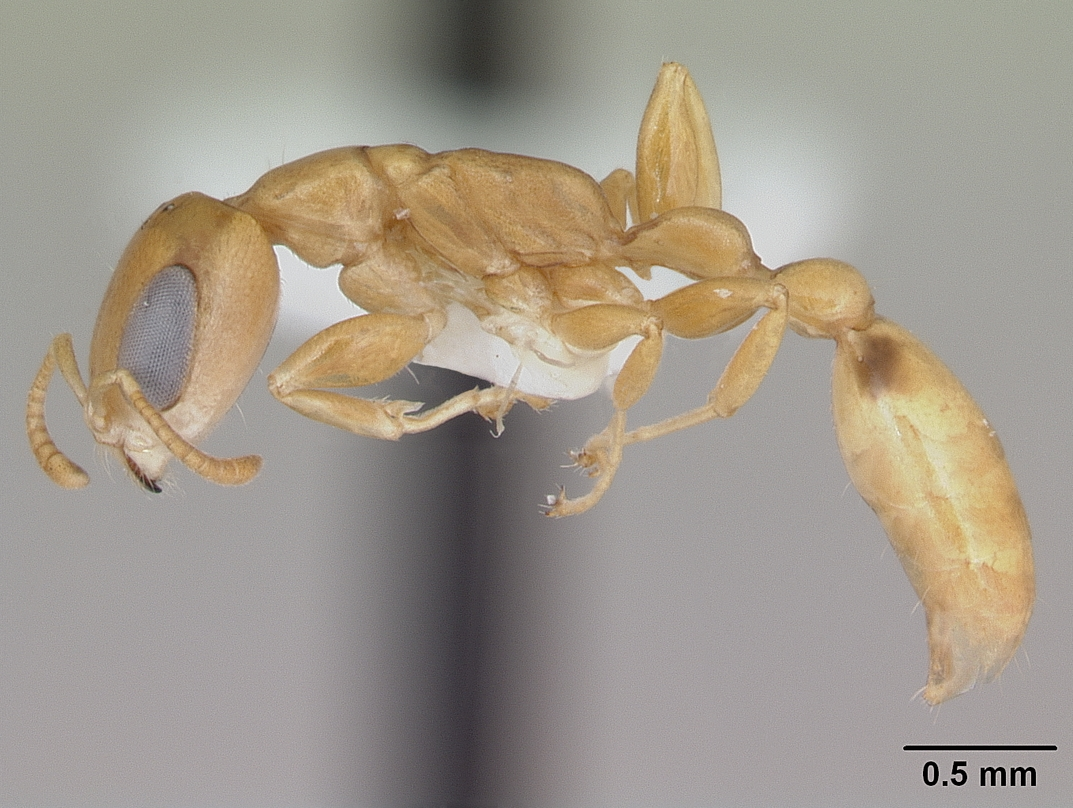
P. simplex

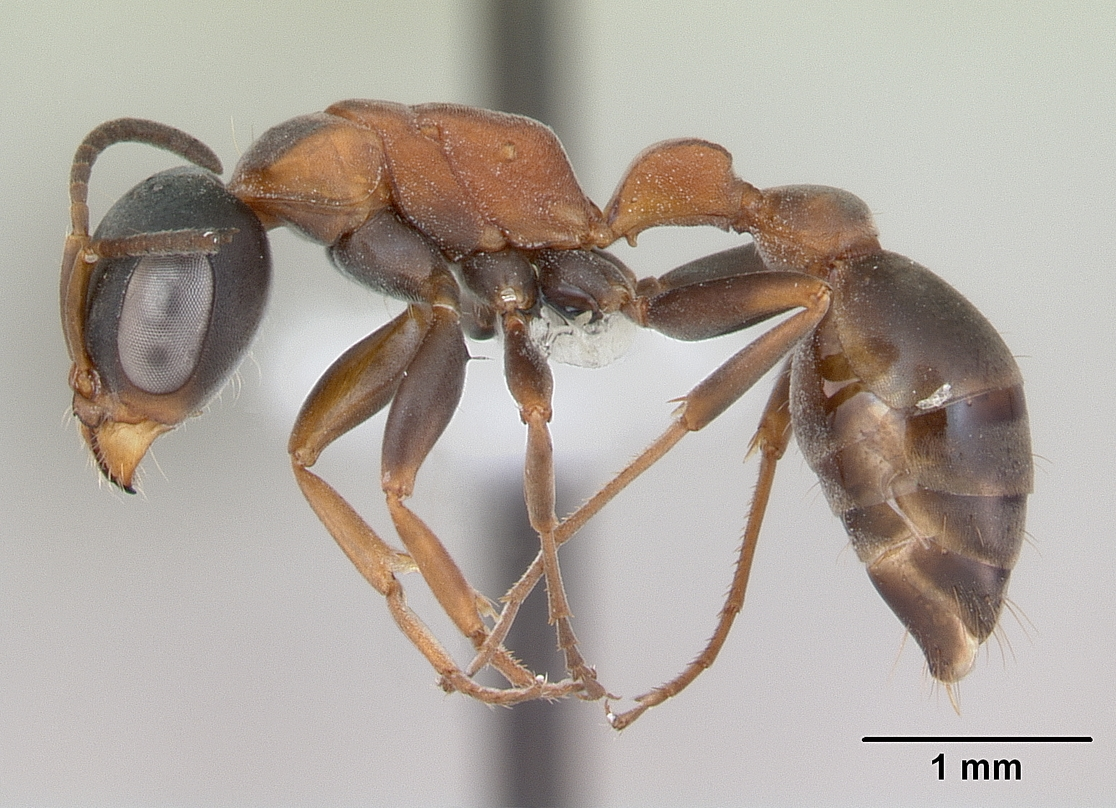
P. termitarius

== Species ==
- Pseudomyrmex acanthobius (Emery, 1896)
- Pseudomyrmex adustus (Borgmeier, 1929)
- Pseudomyrmex alternans (Santschi, 1936)
- Pseudomyrmex alustratus Ward, 1989
- Pseudomyrmex alvarengai Kempf, 1961
- Pseudomyrmex antiguanus (Enzmann, 1944)
- Pseudomyrmex antiquus Ward, 1992
- Pseudomyrmex apache Creighton, 1953
- Pseudomyrmex atripes (Smith, 1860)
- Pseudomyrmex avitus Ward, 1992
- Pseudomyrmex baros Ward, 1992
- Pseudomyrmex beccarii (Menozzi, 1935)
- Pseudomyrmex boopis (Roger, 1863)
- Pseudomyrmex browni Kempf, 1967
- Pseudomyrmex brunneus (Smith, 1877)
- Pseudomyrmex caeciliae (Forel, 1913)
- Pseudomyrmex championi (Forel, 1899)
- Pseudomyrmex cladoicus (Smith, 1858)
- Pseudomyrmex colei (Enzmann, 1944)
- Pseudomyrmex concolor (Smith, 1860)
- Pseudomyrmex coronatus (Wheeler, 1942)
- Pseudomyrmex coruscus Ward, 1992
- Pseudomyrmex cretus Ward, 1989
- Pseudomyrmex cubaensis (Forel, 1901)
- Pseudomyrmex curacaensis (Forel, 1912)
- Pseudomyrmex dendroicus (Forel, 1904)
- Pseudomyrmex denticollis (Emery, 1890)
- Pseudomyrmex depressus (Forel, 1906)
- Pseudomyrmex distinctus (Smith, 1877)
- Pseudomyrmex duckei (Forel, 1906)
- Pseudomyrmex eduardi (Forel, 1912)
- Pseudomyrmex ejectus (Smith, 1858)
- Pseudomyrmex elongatulus (Dalla Torre, 1892)
- Pseudomyrmex elongatus (Mayr, 1870)
- Pseudomyrmex endophytus (Forel, 1912)
- Pseudomyrmex ethicus (Forel, 1911)
- Pseudomyrmex euryblemma (Forel, 1899)
- Pseudomyrmex excisus (Mayr, 1870)
- Pseudomyrmex extinctus (Carpenter, 1930)
- Pseudomyrmex faber (Smith, 1858)
- Pseudomyrmex ferrugineus (Smith, 1877)
- Pseudomyrmex fervidus (Smith, 1877)
- Pseudomyrmex fiebrigi (Forel, 1908)
- Pseudomyrmex filiformis (Fabricius, 1804)
- Pseudomyrmex flavicornis (Smith, 1877)
- Pseudomyrmex flavidulus (Smith, 1858)
- Pseudomyrmex gebellii (Forel, 1899)
- Pseudomyrmex gibbinotus (Forel, 1908)
- Pseudomyrmex godmani (Forel, 1899)
- Pseudomyrmex goeldii (Forel, 1912)
- Pseudomyrmex gracilis (Fabricius, 1804)
- Pseudomyrmex haytianus (Forel, 1901)
- Pseudomyrmex hesperius Ward, 1993
- Pseudomyrmex holmgreni (Wheeler, 1925)
- Pseudomyrmex incurrens (Forel, 1912)
- Pseudomyrmex ita (Forel, 1906)
- Pseudomyrmex janzeni Ward, 1993
- Pseudomyrmex kuenckeli (Emery, 1890)
- Pseudomyrmex laevifrons Ward, 1989
- Pseudomyrmex laevigatus (Smith, 1877)
- Pseudomyrmex laevivertex (Forel, 1906)
- Pseudomyrmex leptosus Ward, 1985
- Pseudomyrmex lynceus (Spinola, 1851)
- Pseudomyrmex macrops Ward, 1992
- Pseudomyrmex maculatus (Smith, 1855)
- Pseudomyrmex major (Forel, 1899)
- Pseudomyrmex malignus (Wheeler, 1921)
- Pseudomyrmex mandibularis (Spinola, 1851)
- Pseudomyrmex mixtecus Ward, 1993
- Pseudomyrmex monochrous (Dalla Torre, 1892)
- Pseudomyrmex nexilis Ward, 1992
- Pseudomyrmex niger (Donisthorpe, 1940)
- Pseudomyrmex nigrescens (Forel, 1904)
- Pseudomyrmex nigrocinctus (Emery, 1890)
- Pseudomyrmex nigropilosus (Emery, 1890)
- Pseudomyrmex oculatus (Smith, 1855)
- Pseudomyrmex oki (Forel, 1906)
- Pseudomyrmex opaciceps Ward, 1993
- Pseudomyrmex opacior (Forel, 1904)
- Pseudomyrmex oryctus Ward, 1992
- Pseudomyrmex osurus (Forel, 1911)
- Pseudomyrmex pallens (Mayr, 1870)
- Pseudomyrmex pallidus (Smith, 1855)
- Pseudomyrmex particeps Ward, 1993
- Pseudomyrmex pazosi (Santschi, 1909)
- Pseudomyrmex peperi (Forel, 1913)
- Pseudomyrmex perboscii (Guerin-Meneville, 1844)
- Pseudomyrmex peruvianus (Wheeler, 1925)
- Pseudomyrmex phyllophilus (Smith, 1858)
- Pseudomyrmex pictus (Stitz, 1913)
- Pseudomyrmex pisinnus Ward, 1989
- Pseudomyrmex prioris Ward, 1992
- Pseudomyrmex pupa (Forel, 1911)
- Pseudomyrmex reconditus Ward, 1993
- Pseudomyrmex rochai (Forel, 1912)
- Pseudomyrmex rufiventris (Forel, 1911)
- Pseudomyrmex rufomedius (Smith, 1877)
- Pseudomyrmex salvini (Forel, 1899)
- Pseudomyrmex santschii (Enzmann, 1944)
- Pseudomyrmex satanicus (Wheeler, 1942)
- †Pseudomyrmex saxulum LaPolla & Greenwalt, 2015
- Pseudomyrmex schuppi (Forel, 1901)
- Pseudomyrmex seminole Ward, 1985
- Pseudomyrmex sericeus (Mayr, 1870)
- Pseudomyrmex simplex (Smith, 1877)
- Pseudomyrmex simulans Kempf, 1958
- Pseudomyrmex solisi (Santschi, 1916)
- Pseudomyrmex spiculus Ward, 1989
- Pseudomyrmex spinicola (Emery, 1890)
- Pseudomyrmex squamifer (Emery, 1890)
- Pseudomyrmex subater (Wheeler, 1914)
- Pseudomyrmex subtilissimus (Emery, 1890)
- Pseudomyrmex succinus Ward, 1992
- Pseudomyrmex tachigaliae (Forel, 1904)
- Pseudomyrmex tenuis (Fabricius, 1804)
- Pseudomyrmex tenuissimus (Emery, 1906)
- Pseudomyrmex terminalis (Smith, 1877)
- Pseudomyrmex termitarius (Smith, 1855)
- Pseudomyrmex thecolor Ward, 1992
- Pseudomyrmex triplaridis (Forel, 1904)
- Pseudomyrmex triplarinus (Weddell, 1850)
- Pseudomyrmex unicolor (Smith, 1855)
- Pseudomyrmex urbanus (Smith, 1877)
- Pseudomyrmex veneficus (Wheeler, 1942)
- Pseudomyrmex venustus (Smith, 1858)
- †Pseudomyrmex vicinus Ward, 1992
- Pseudomyrmex viduus (Smith, 1858)
- Pseudomyrmex villosus Ward, 1989
- Pseudomyrmex voytowskii (Enzmann, 1944)
- Pseudomyrmex weberi (Enzmann, 1944)
- Pseudomyrmex wheeleri (Enzmann, 1944)
