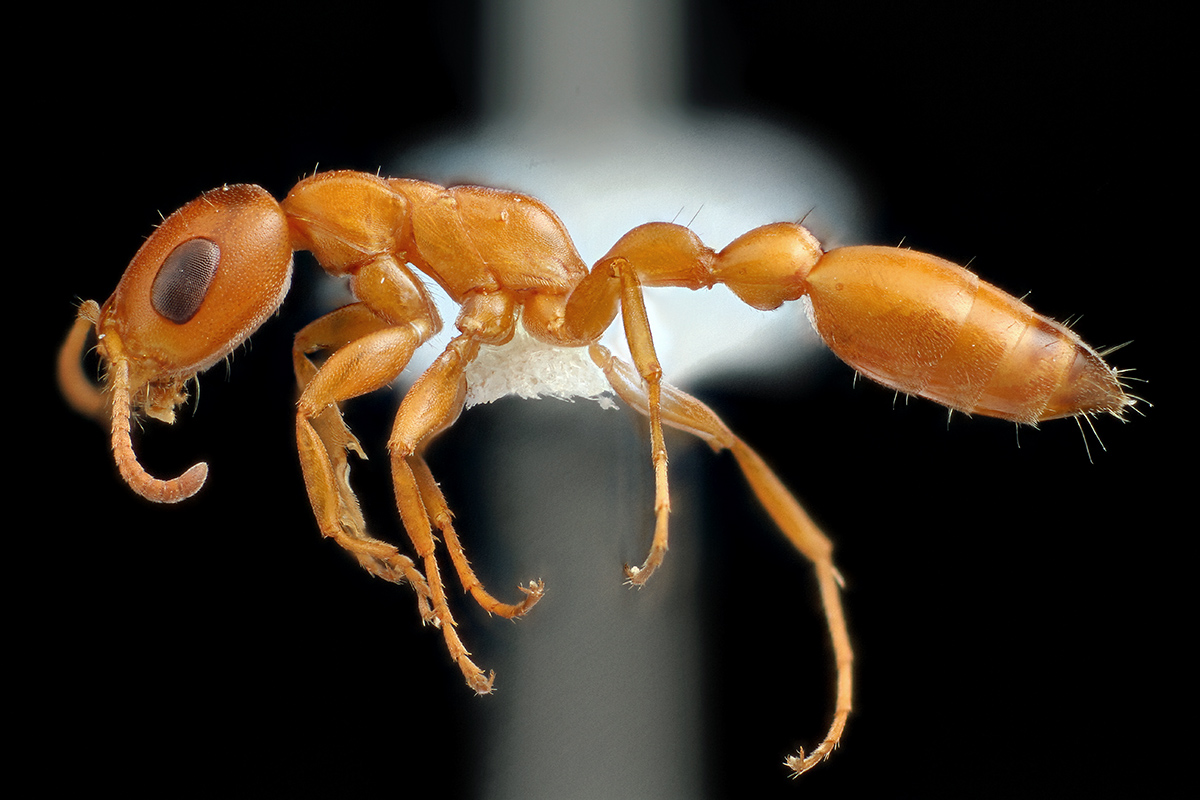

Scientific classification
- Domain: Eukaryota
- Kingdom: Animalia
- Phylum: Arthropoda
- Class: Insecta
- Order: Hymenoptera
- Family: Formicidae
- Genus: Pseudomyrmex
- Species: P. apache

Binomial name
- Pseudomyrmex apache Creighton, 1953

= Pseudomyrmex apache =

Species of ant

Pseudomyrmex apache is a species of Pseudomyrmecine ant native to the southwest United States, Mexico, and possibly Florida.

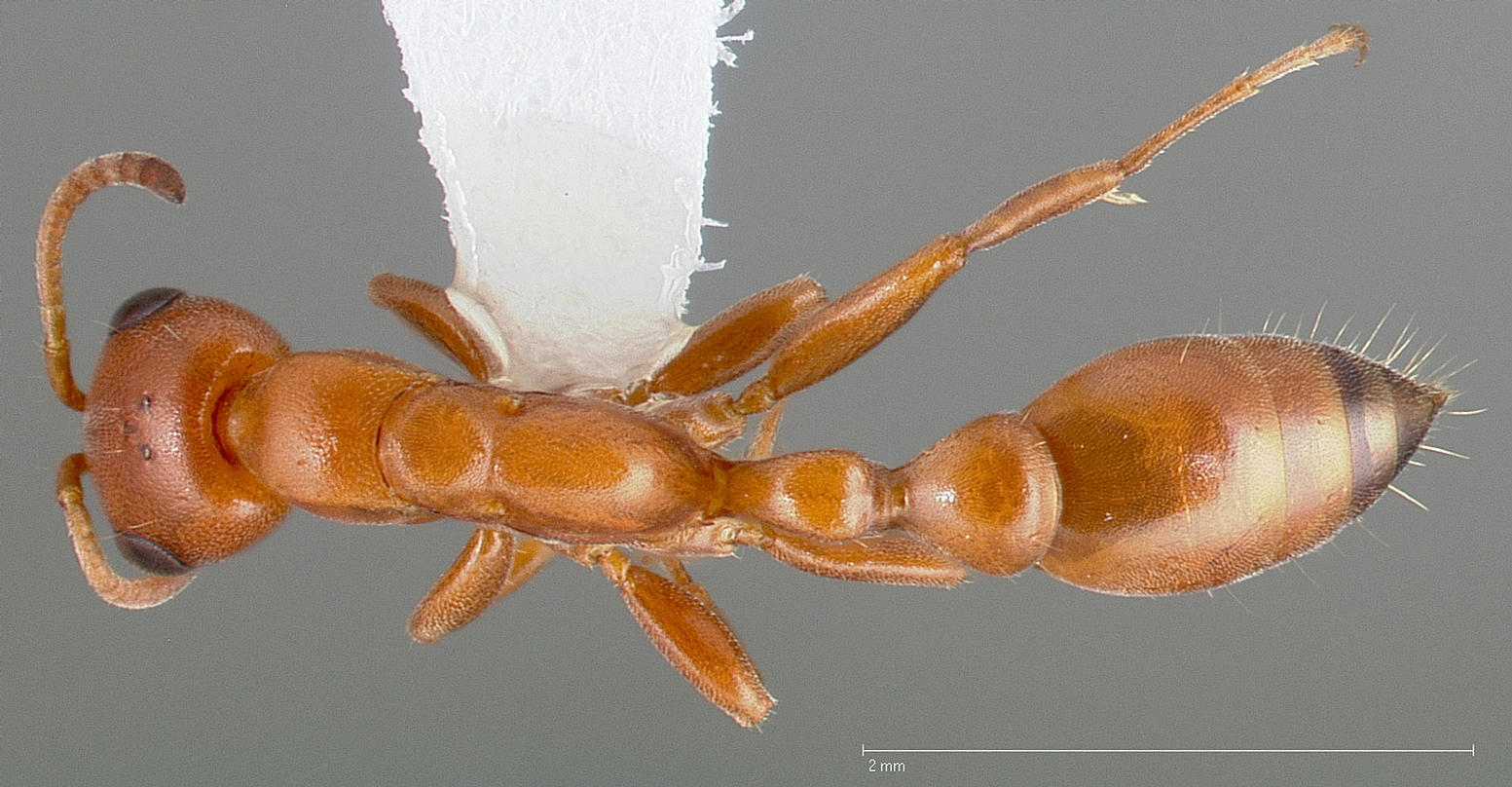

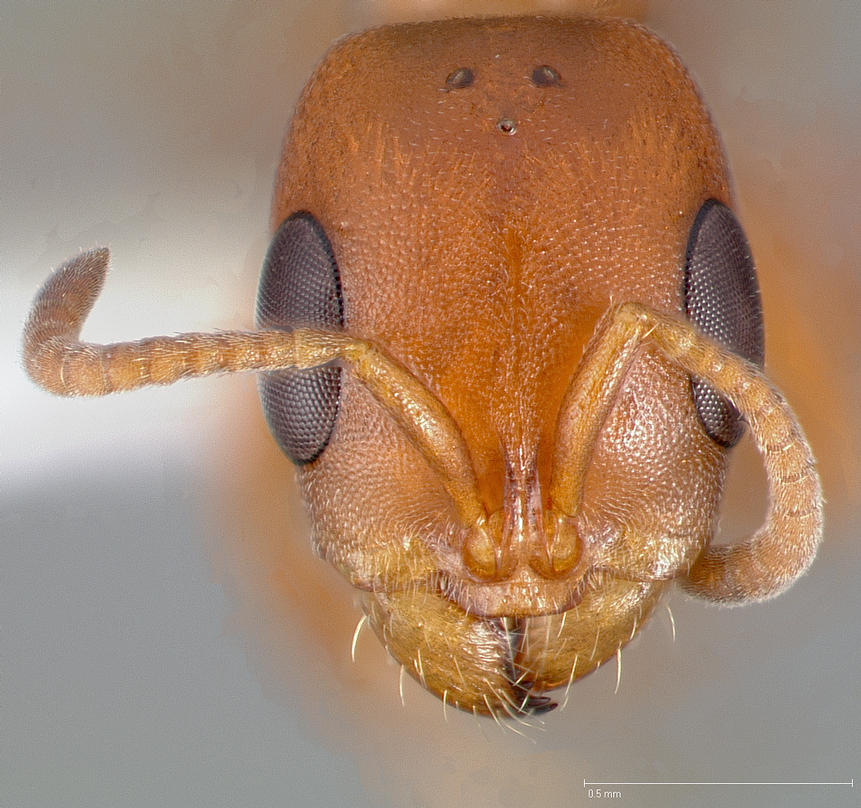

== Description ==
Pseudomyrmex apache is golden yellow in color and ranges from 5–8 mm in overall length.
