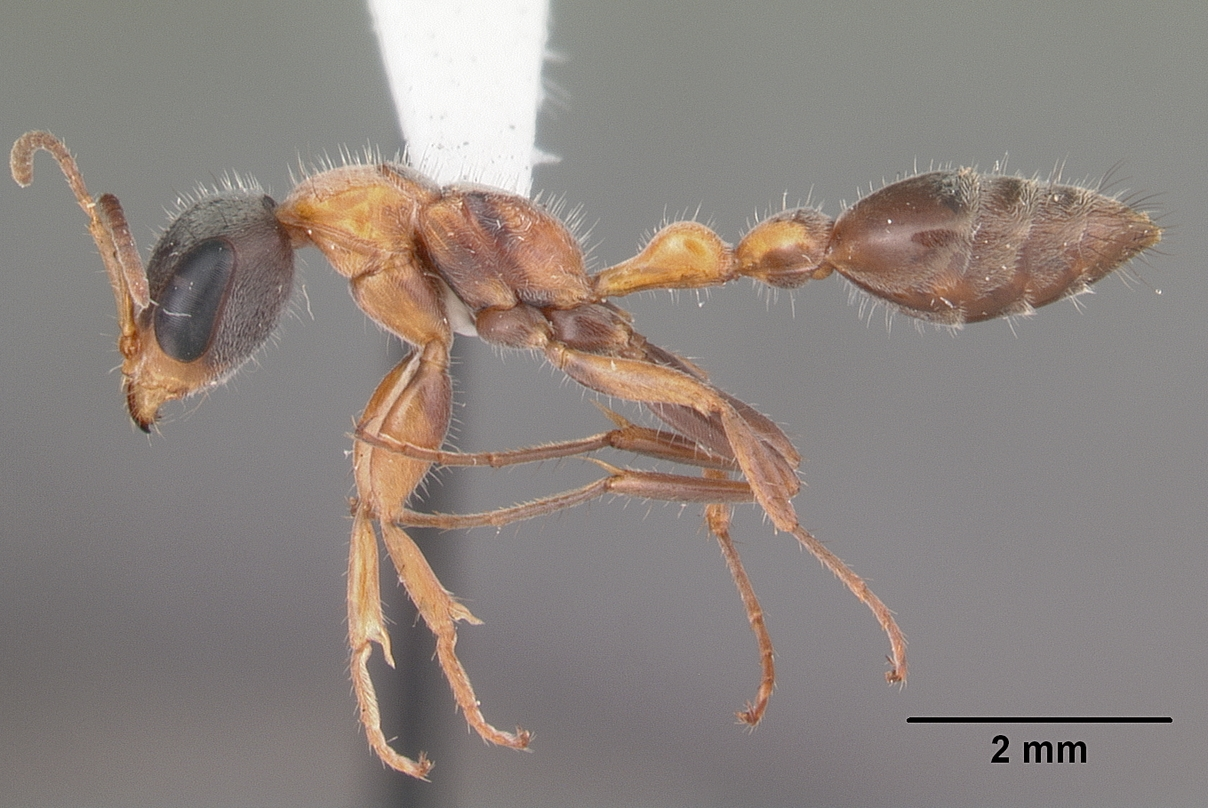
- Pseudomyrmex gracilis worker

Scientific classification
- Domain: Eukaryota
- Kingdom: Animalia
- Phylum: Arthropoda
- Class: Insecta
- Order: Hymenoptera
- Family: Formicidae
- Genus: Pseudomyrmex
- Species: P. gracilis

Binomial name
- Pseudomyrmex gracilis (Fabricius, 1804)

= Pseudomyrmex gracilis =

Species of ant

Pseudomyrmex gracilis, also known as the graceful twig ant, Mexican twig ant, slender twig ant, or elongated twig ant, is a large, slender species of ant native to Mexico and arid parts of the US. The workers are about 8–10 millimeters (0.31–0.39 in) in length and generally wasp-like in appearance and style of movement. Worker ants are bi-colored; the head and gaster are dark, while the antennae, mouthparts, thorax and legs are dull orange with dark shading. They often may be seen on vegetation, foraging for live insects or collecting honeydew from sap-sucking insects.

If the colony ever finds themselves without a queen, the worker ants form dominance hierarchies by boxing with their antennae. This leads to a couple high ranking individuals which can lay eggs until a new queen returns.

== Images ==
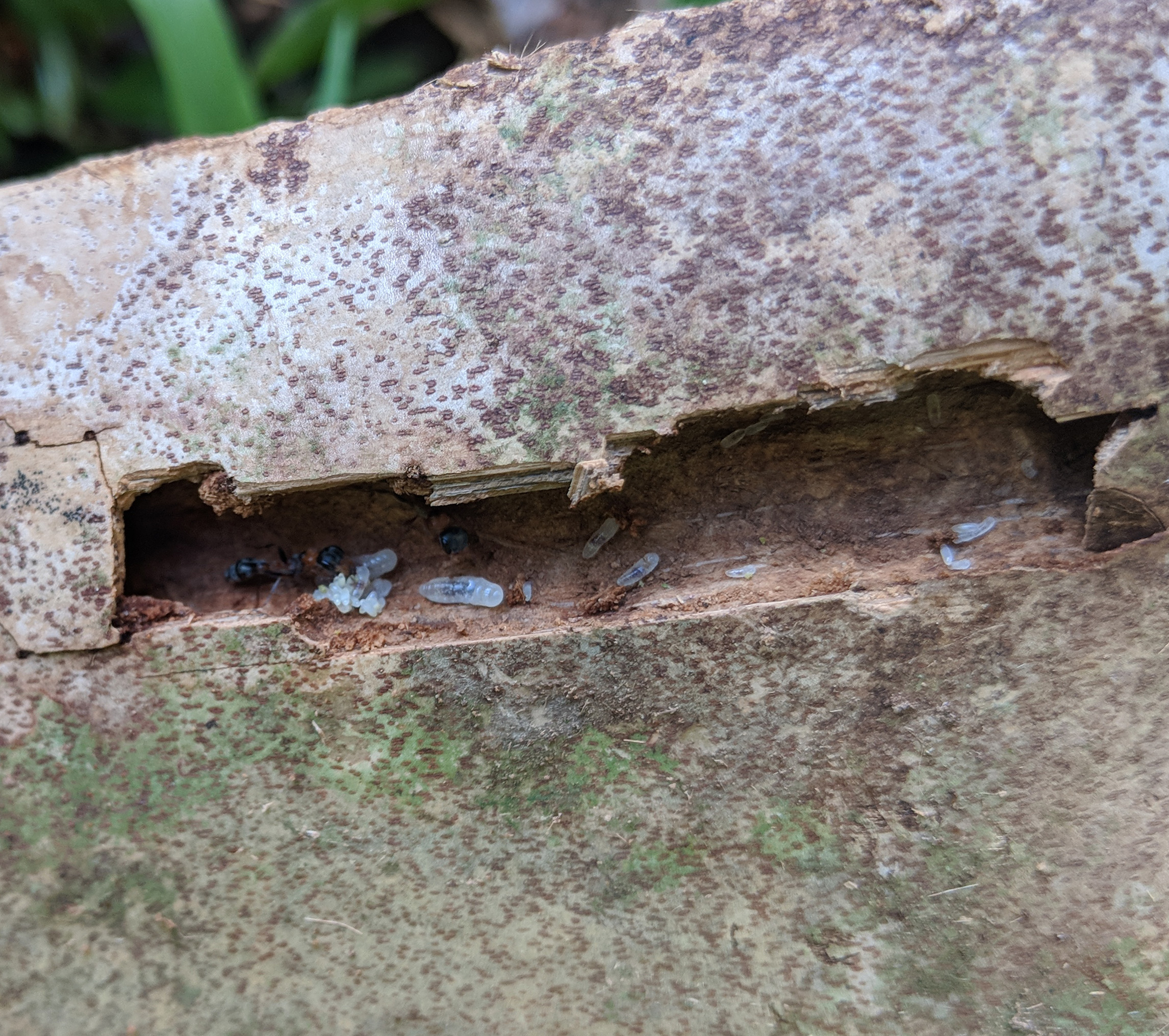
Colony chamber – shows multiple life stages of P. gracilis nesting in a Sabal palmetto frond
