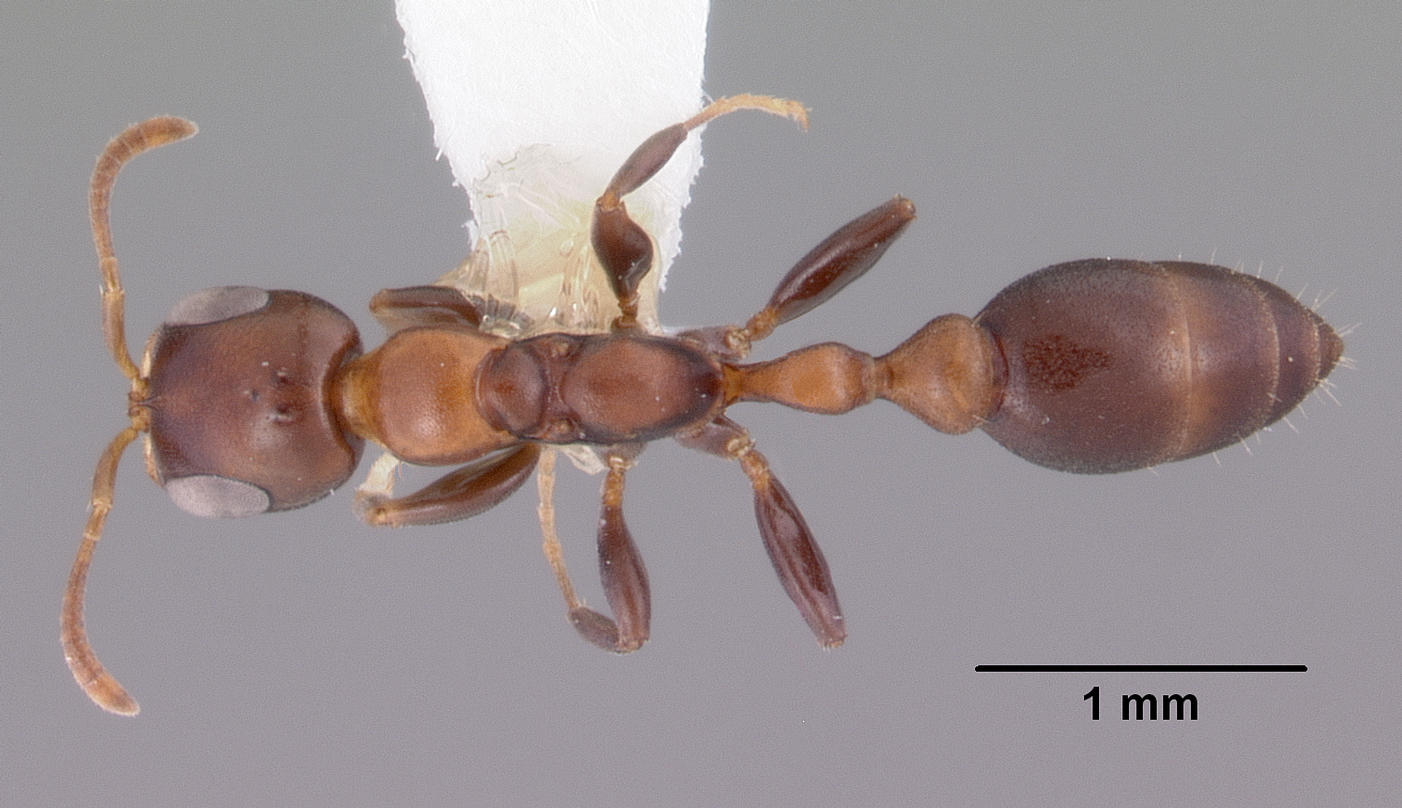

Scientific classification
- Domain: Eukaryota
- Kingdom: Animalia
- Phylum: Arthropoda
- Class: Insecta
- Order: Hymenoptera
- Family: Formicidae
- Genus: Pseudomyrmex
- Species: P. ejectus

Binomial name
- Pseudomyrmex ejectus (Smith, 1858)

= Pseudomyrmex ejectus =

Species of ant

Pseudomyrmex ejectus is a species of ant in the family Formicidae.

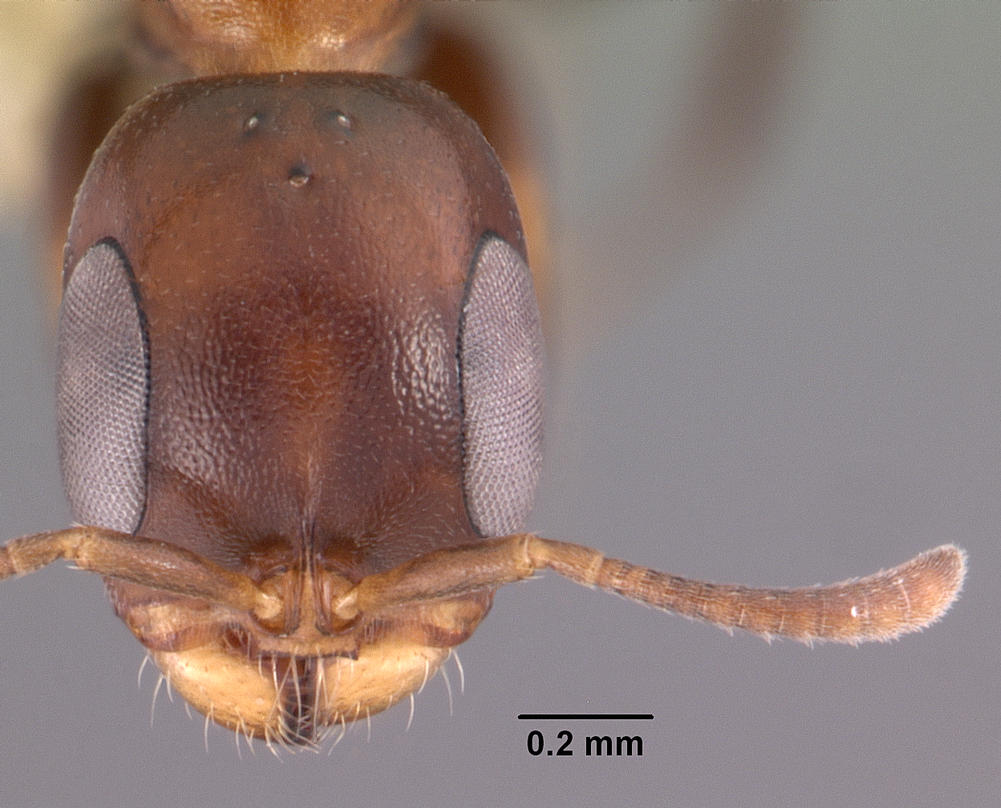

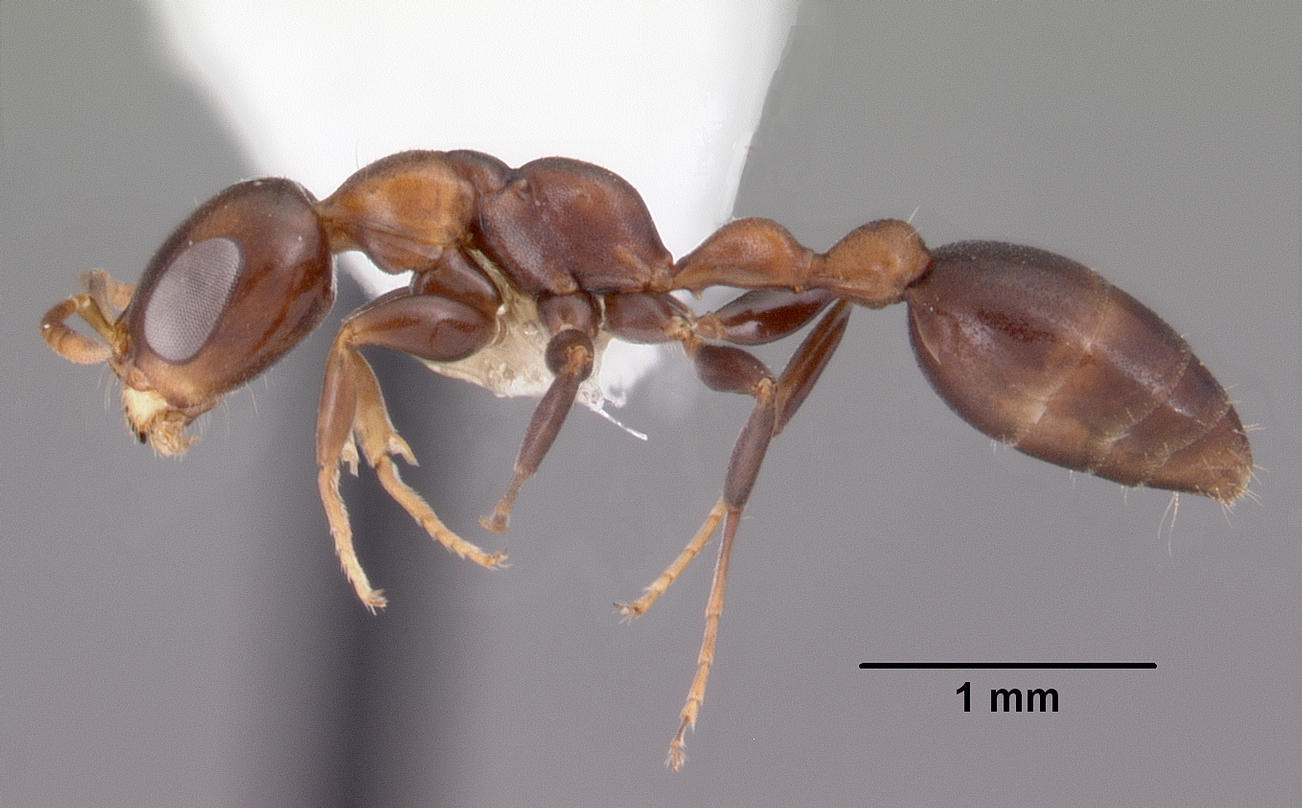
