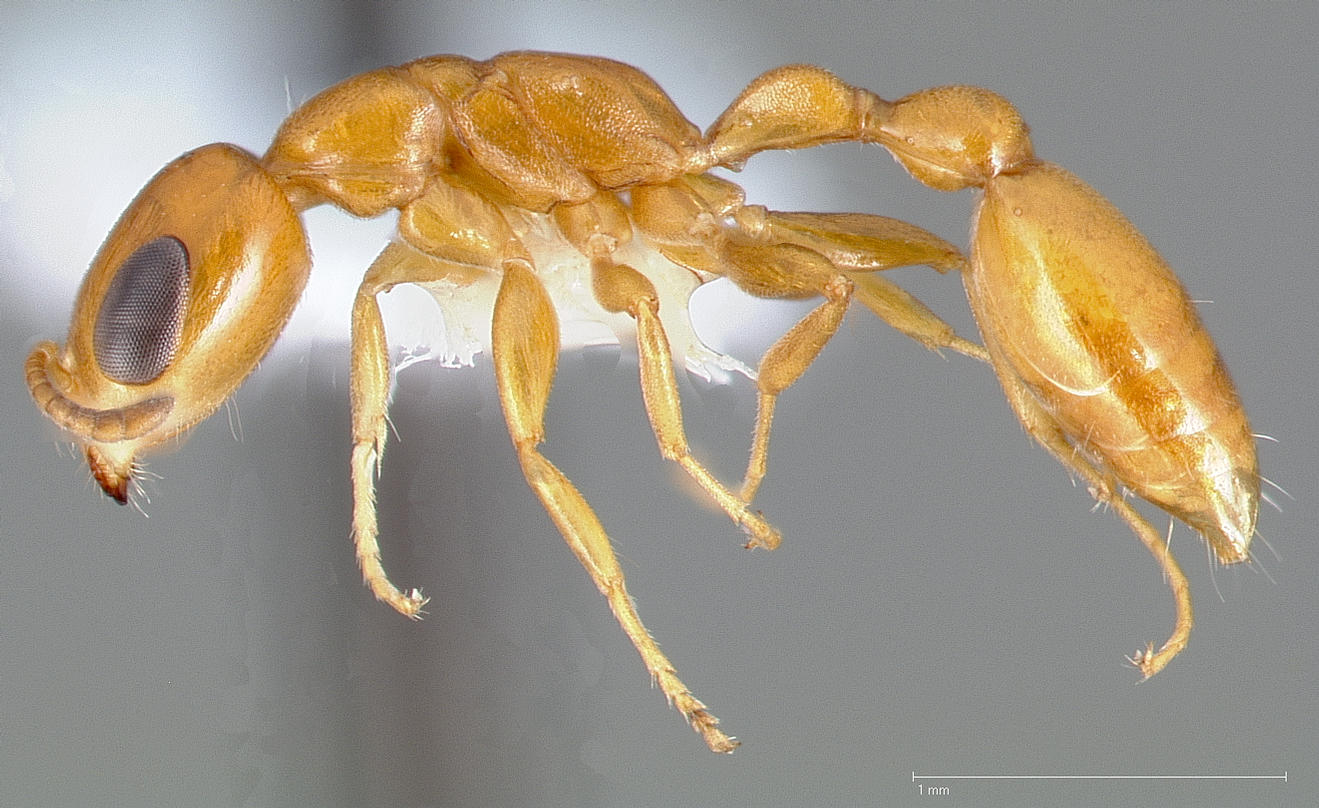
- Pseudomyrmex pallidus worker

Scientific classification
- Domain: Eukaryota
- Kingdom: Animalia
- Phylum: Arthropoda
- Class: Insecta
- Order: Hymenoptera
- Family: Formicidae
- Genus: Pseudomyrmex
- Species: P. pallidus

Binomial name
- Pseudomyrmex pallidus (F. Smith, 1855)

= Pseudomyrmex pallidus =

Species of ant

Pseudomyrmex pallidus is a species of ant found in the Nearctic realm with an extensive range throughout the southern United States to Central America.

== Morphology ==
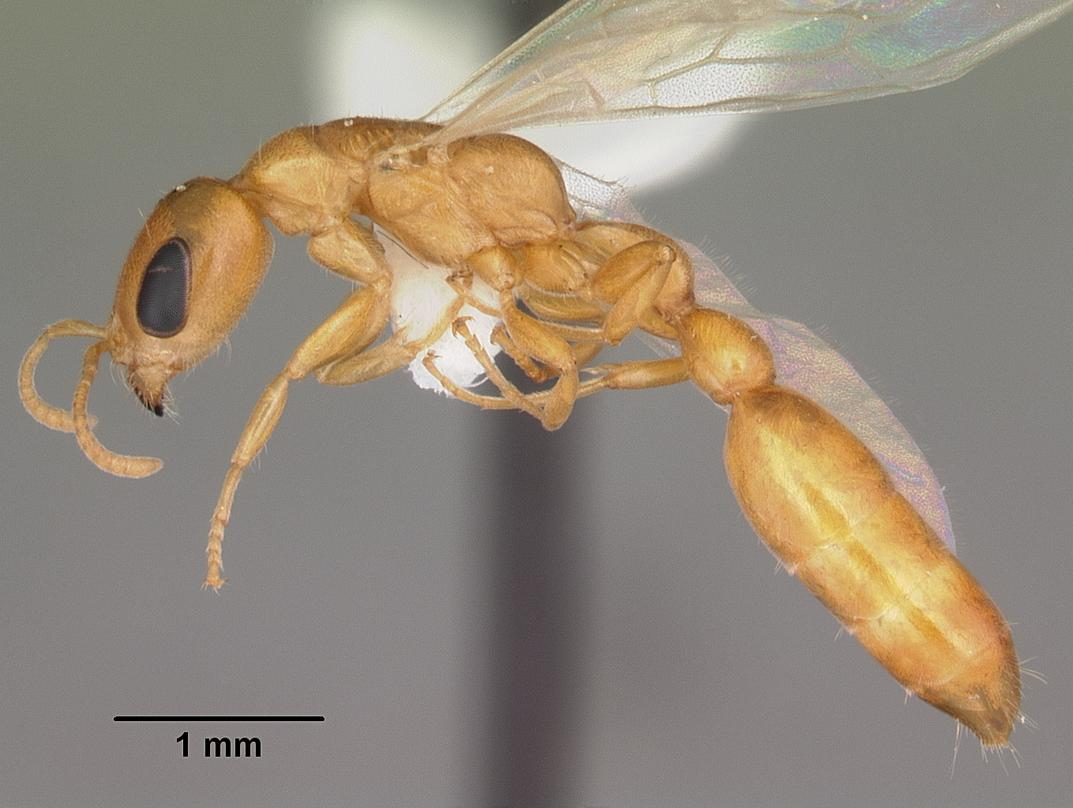
Queen

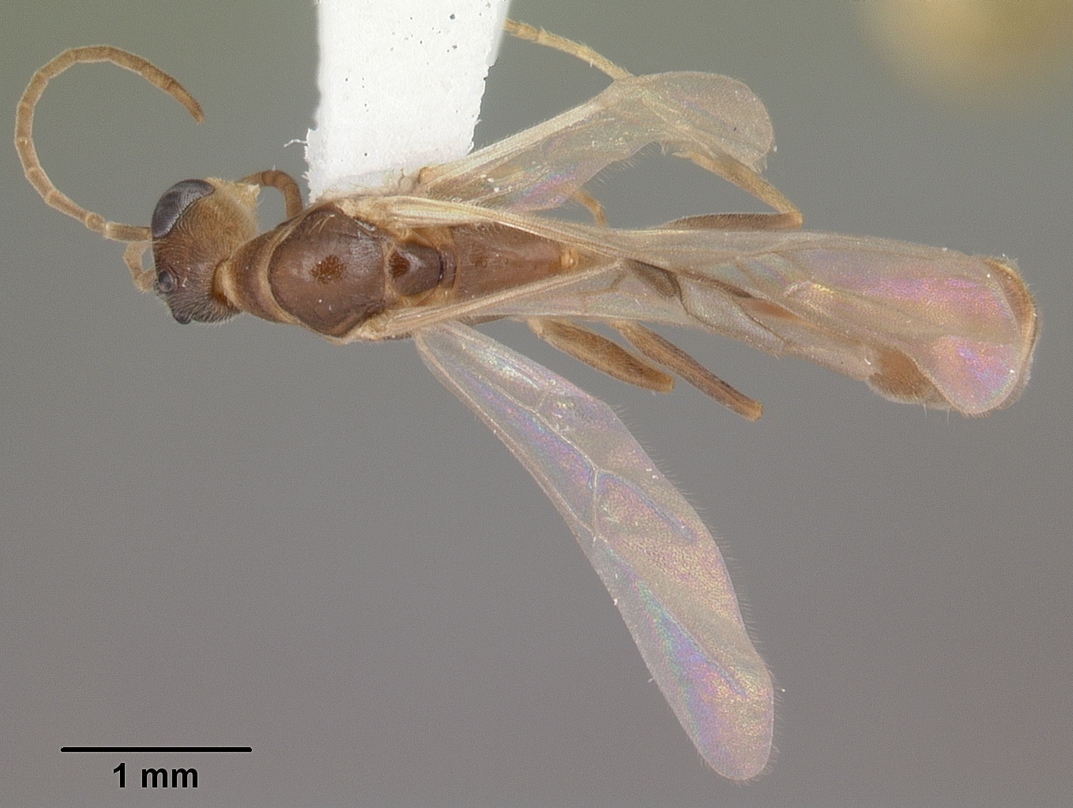
Male

Workers are yellow, orange, or brown. They are slender with large eyes, short antennal scapes and a well-developed sting. Head widths measure 0.68–0.89 millimeters. The surface of the head is shiny, due to the lack of a fine hairy covering. Workers of P. pallidus are monomorphic.

Both virgin female and male reproductives are winged. Mated queens in the nest can be identified by scars on their thorax where the wings were previously attached. They can also be identified by their distended gasters. Males are dark brown, with curved antennae and small heads.

== Habitat ==
Nests of this species are found in the hollow stems of dead grasses. Although they show a preference for herbaceous plants, nests have also been found in the dead stems of woody twigs. Nests are generally found at the intersection of grassy and wooded habitats, possibly due to shading from the canopy in warmer months and exposure to sunlight in colder months. The entrance to the colony consists of a round to oblong entrance measuring 1–2 mm (0.04–0.08 in) on the face of the stem, and can easily be plugged by the body of a single worker to prevent access to the brood by predators. Stems containing P. pallidus are 5–10 mm (0.20–0.39 in) in diameter, and the excavated chambers are 11.8–72 cm (4.6–28.3 in) long.

== Diet ==
Colonies reared in the laboratory will readily accept sucrose solution and dead insect parts as a food source, which suggest that their diet in the field consist of floral secretions such as nectar, and insect prey. Food stores are not found in nests collected in the field, neither are they found in colonies raised in laboratory observation nests. This implies that any food brought into the nest is directly fed to nestmates and larvae.

== Colony structure ==
Colonies are facultatively polygynous, consisting of 1–15 queen ants and 20–200 workers. Colonies are also polydomous, where a colony consists of more than one nest site. Queenless colonies containing only brood and workers have been found, suggesting that these function as auxiliary brood rearing sites. Workers are produced throughout the year, as are reproductive females. However, males appear to only be produced during the summer and the fall seasons, as they are absent from nests collected in the winter.

== Mating ==
Reproductive females can be collected from colonies throughout the year, which indicates that mating occurs in more than one season. There is no specific information on the mating habits of P. pallidus.
