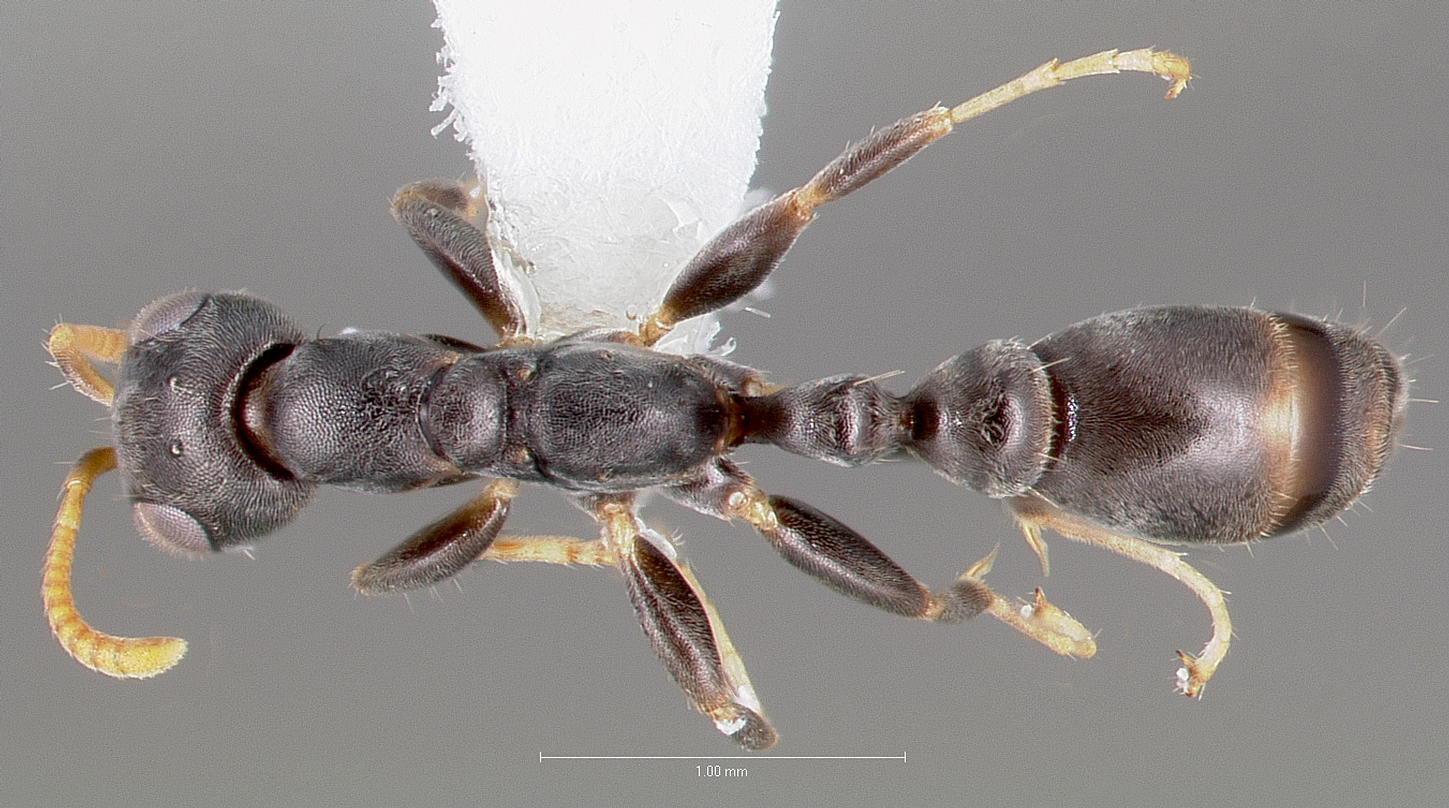

Scientific classification
- Domain: Eukaryota
- Kingdom: Animalia
- Phylum: Arthropoda
- Class: Insecta
- Order: Hymenoptera
- Family: Formicidae
- Genus: Pseudomyrmex
- Species: P. cubaensis

Binomial name
- Pseudomyrmex cubaensis (Forel, 1901)

= Pseudomyrmex cubaensis =

Species of ant

Pseudomyrmex cubaensis is a species of ant in the family Formicidae.

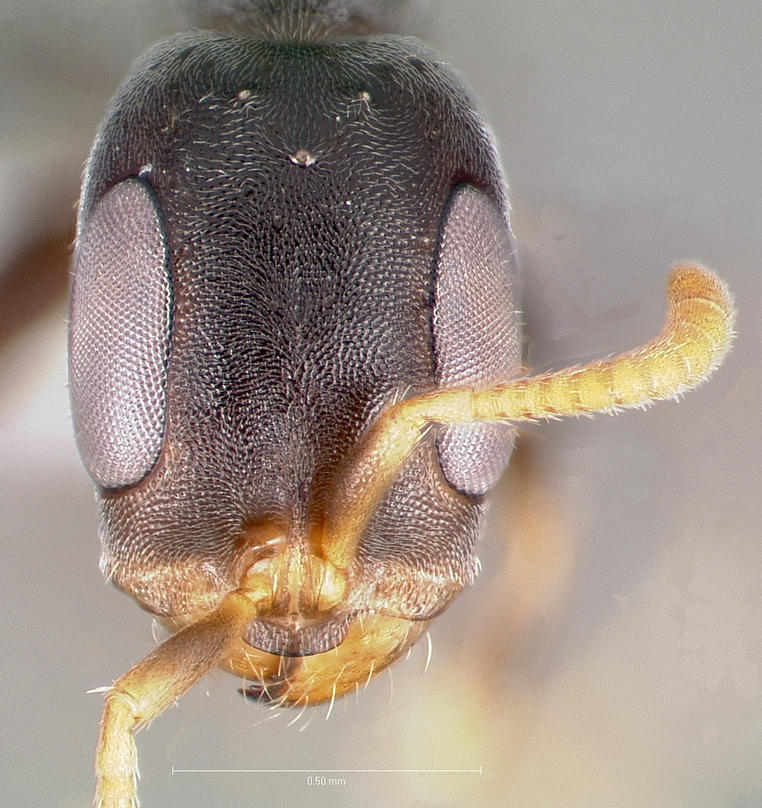

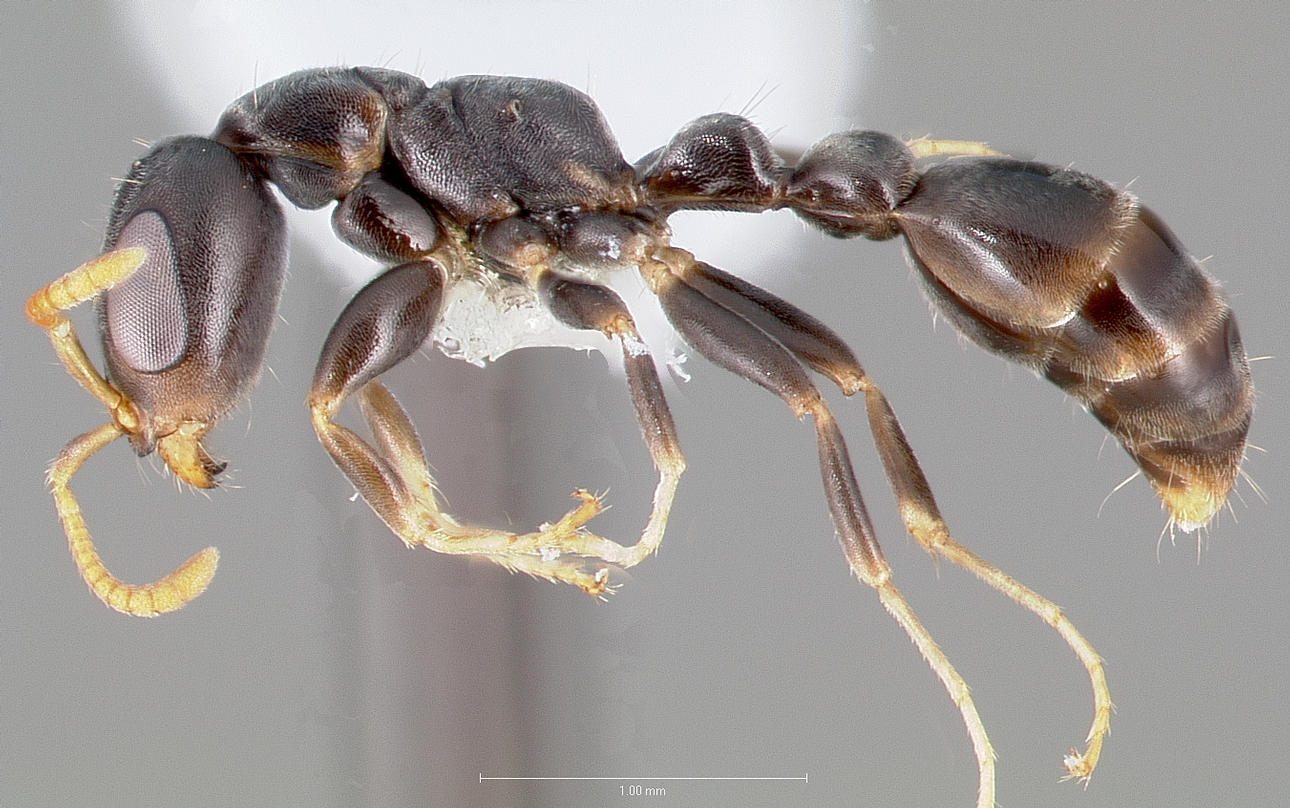
