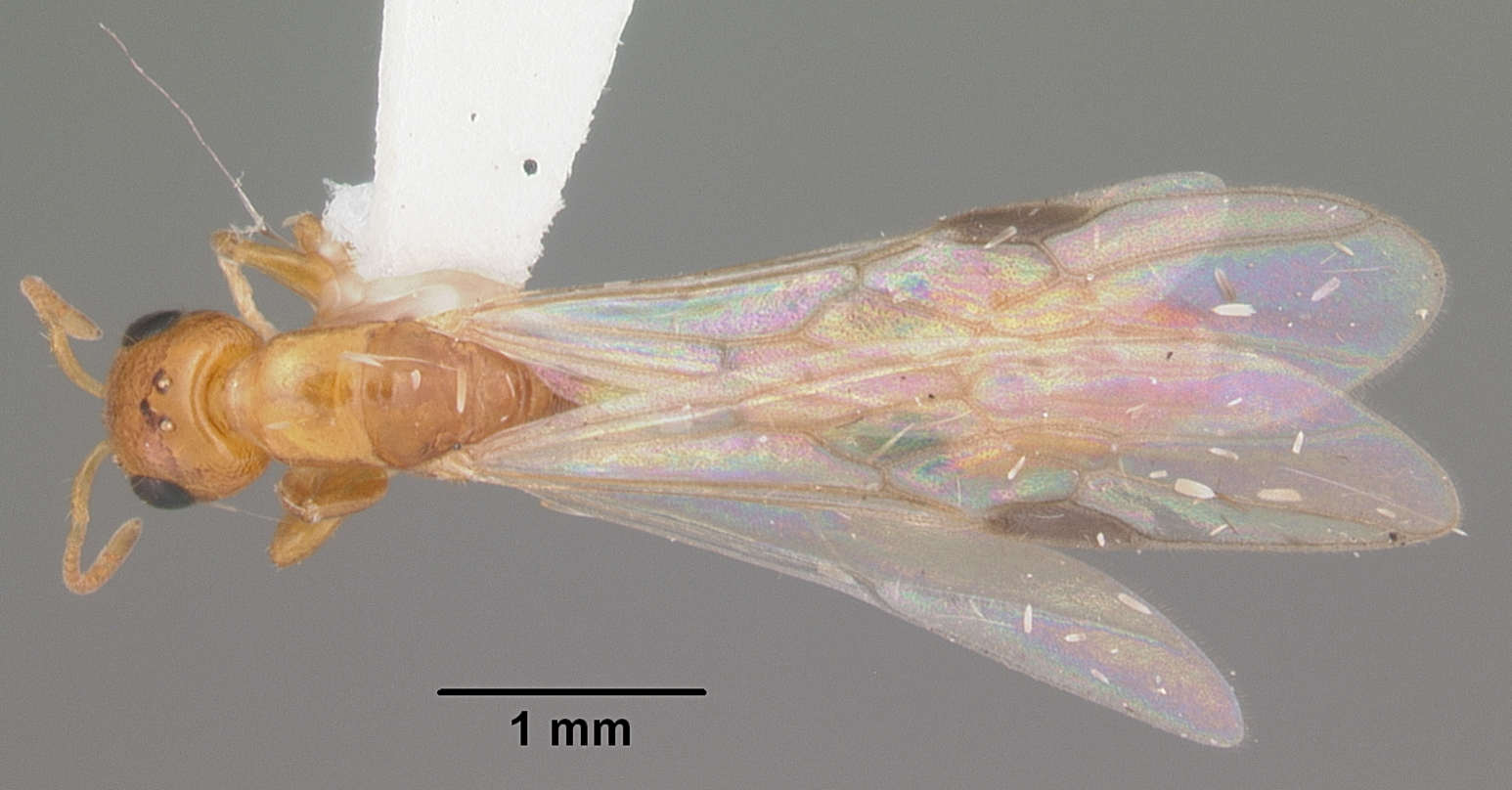

Scientific classification
- Domain: Eukaryota
- Kingdom: Animalia
- Phylum: Arthropoda
- Class: Insecta
- Order: Hymenoptera
- Family: Formicidae
- Genus: Pseudomyrmex
- Species: P. simplex

Binomial name
- Pseudomyrmex simplex (Smith, 1877)

= Pseudomyrmex simplex =

Species of ant

Pseudomyrmex simplex is a species of ant in the family Formicidae.

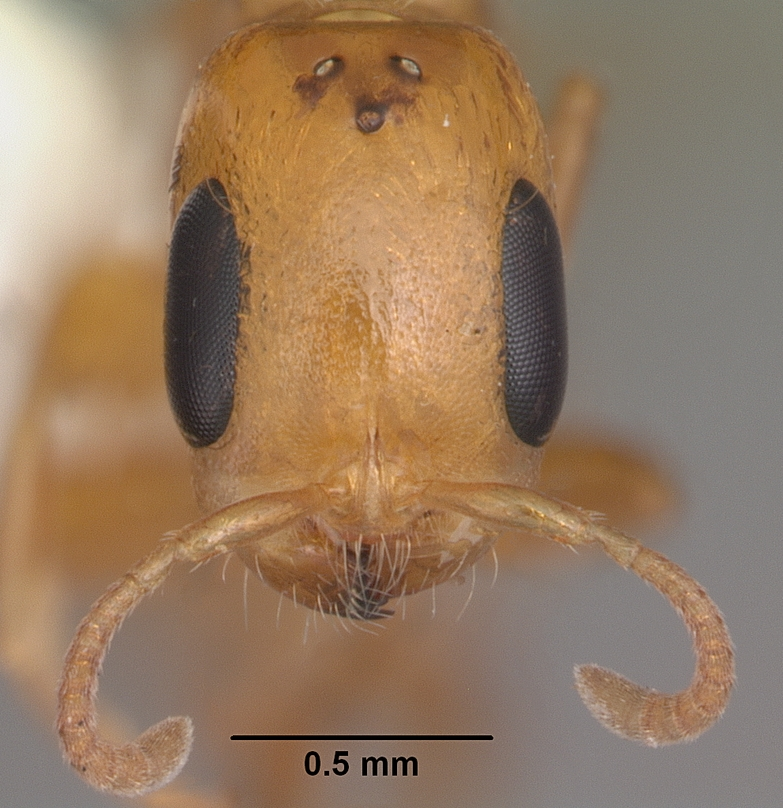

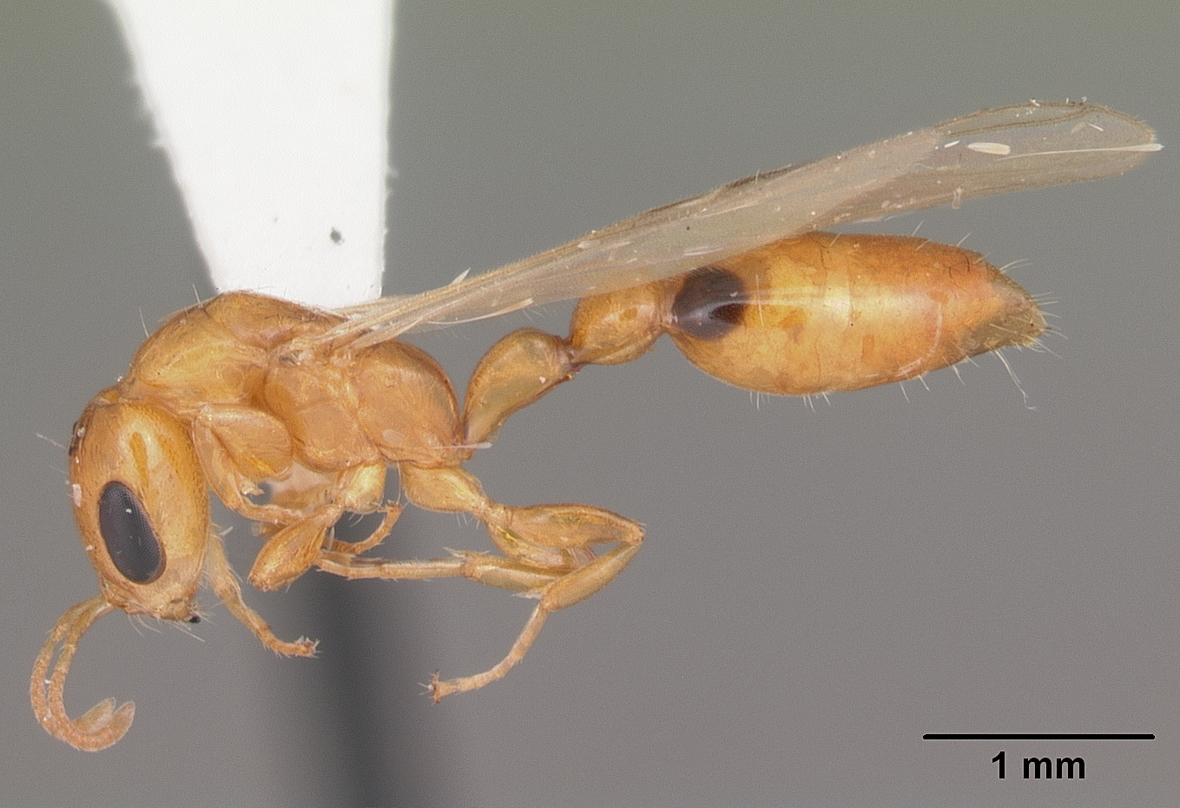
