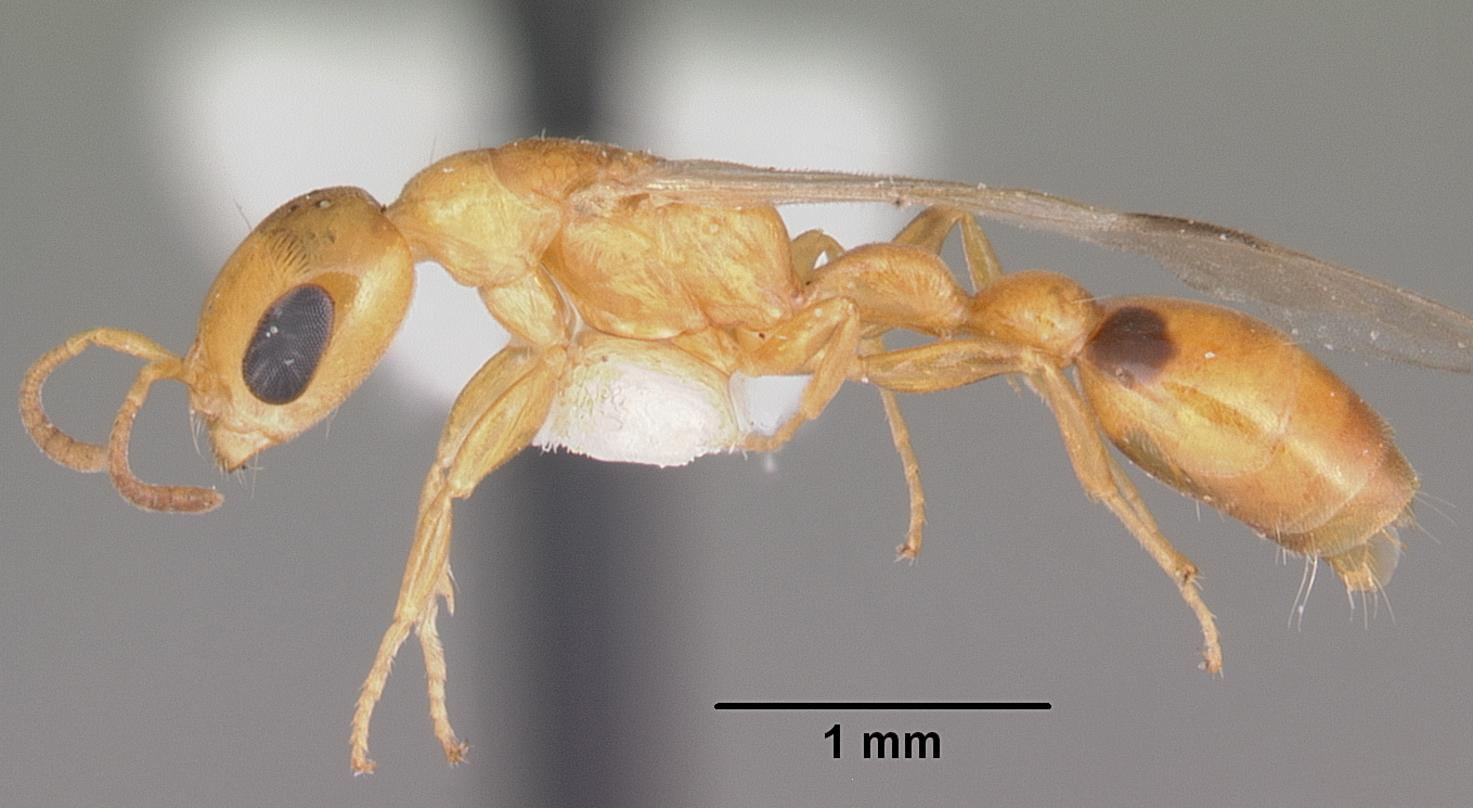

Conservation status
- Vulnerable (IUCN 2.3)

Scientific classification
- Kingdom: Animalia
- Phylum: Arthropoda
- Class: Insecta
- Order: Hymenoptera
- Family: Formicidae
- Genus: Pseudomyrmex
- Species: P. leptosus

Binomial name
- Pseudomyrmex leptosus Ward, 1985

= Pseudomyrmex leptosus =

Species of ant

Pseudomyrmex leptosus is a species of ant in the genus Pseudomyrmex. It is endemic to certain regions in the United States. The species has completely lost its worker caste.
