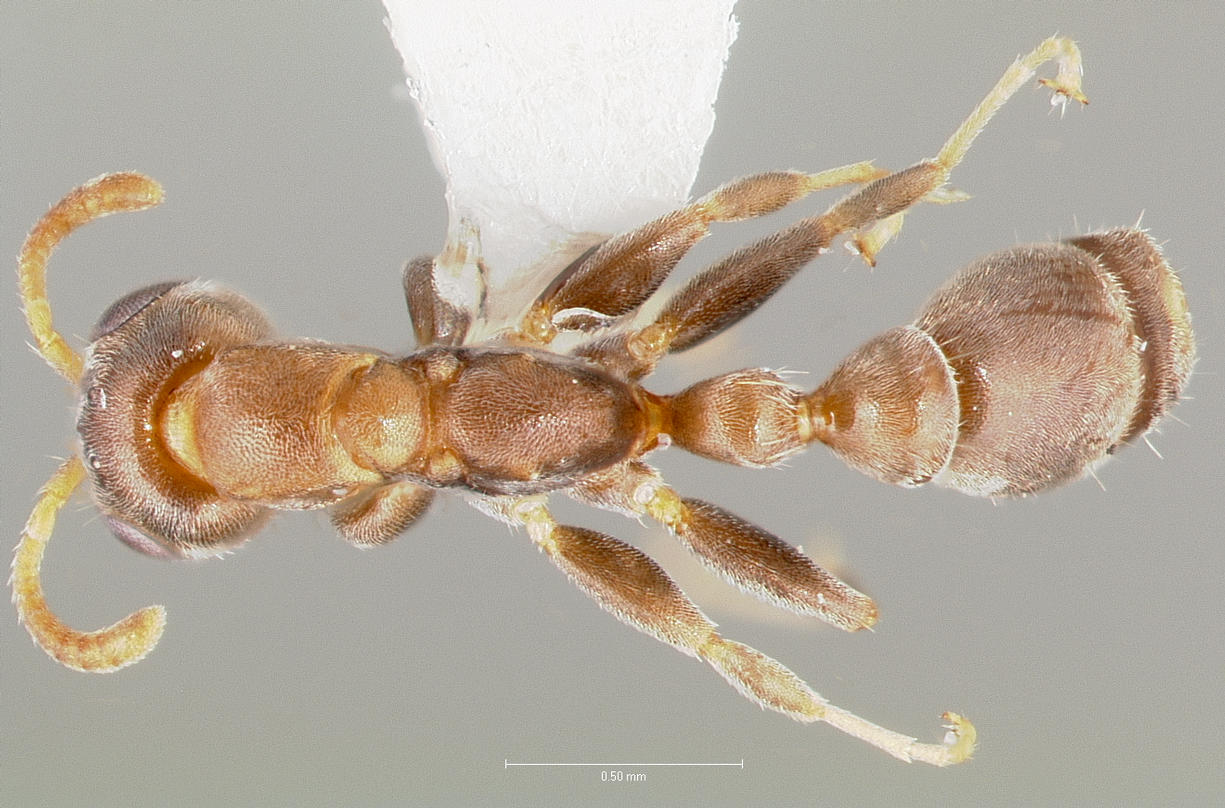

Scientific classification
- Domain: Eukaryota
- Kingdom: Animalia
- Phylum: Arthropoda
- Class: Insecta
- Order: Hymenoptera
- Family: Formicidae
- Genus: Pseudomyrmex
- Species: P. elongatus

Binomial name
- Pseudomyrmex elongatus (Mayr, 1870)

= Pseudomyrmex elongatus =

Species of ant

Pseudomyrmex elongatus is a species of ant in the family Formicidae.

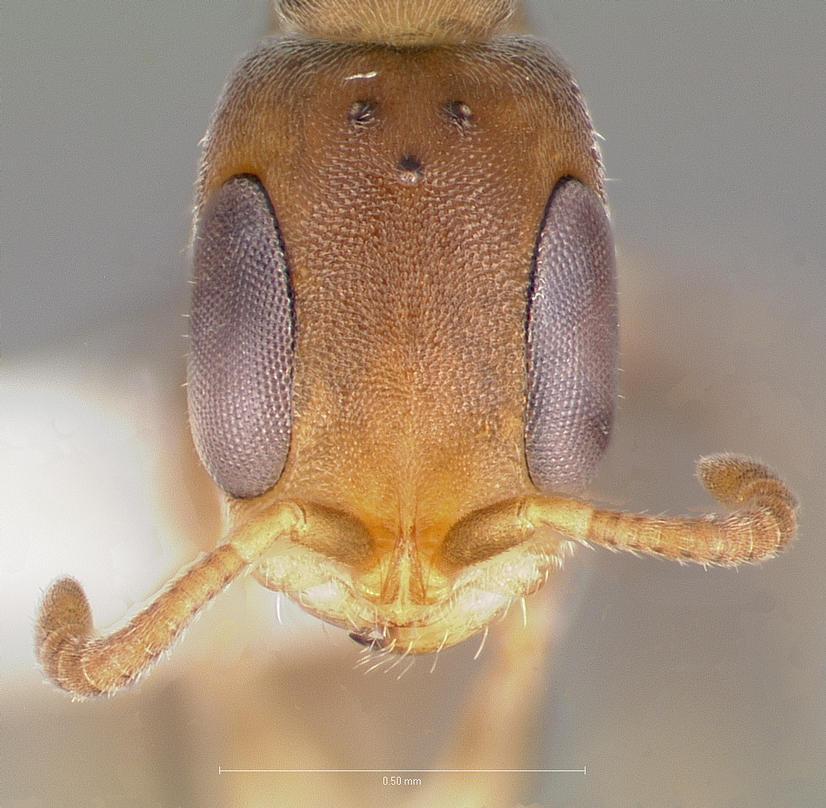

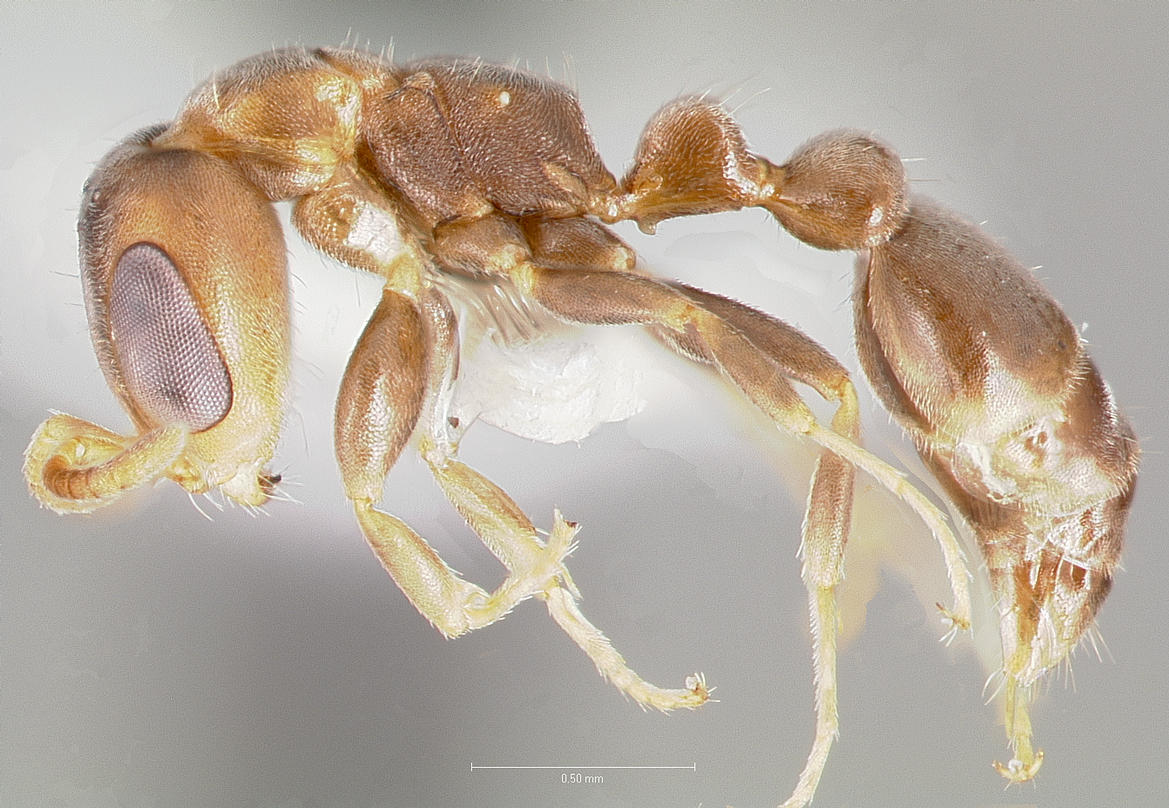

They are widely spread and are a common species from Mexico to Argentina. They have long eyes, a predominantly opaque head, and have a small size (HW 0.56-0.68).
