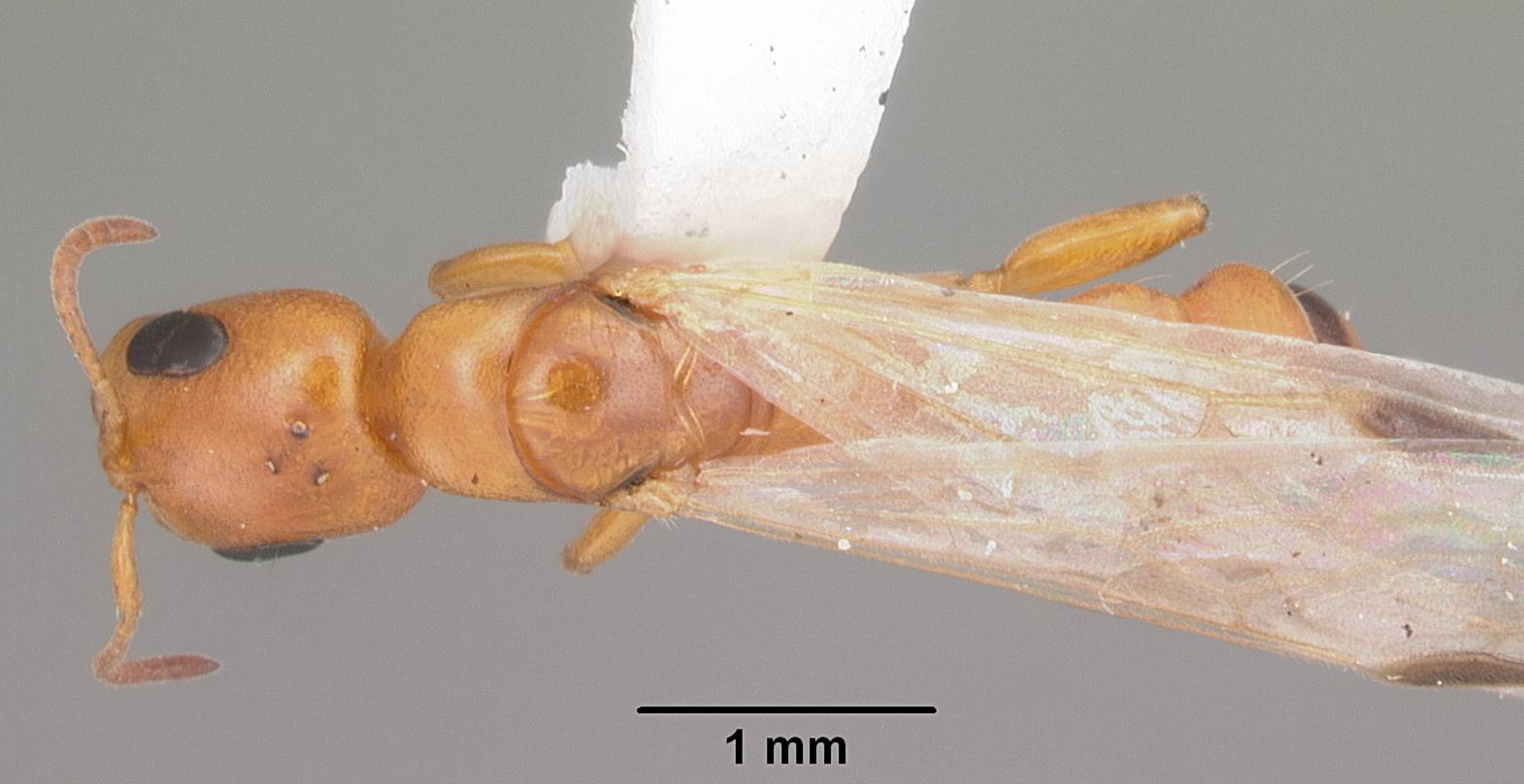

Scientific classification
- Domain: Eukaryota
- Kingdom: Animalia
- Phylum: Arthropoda
- Class: Insecta
- Order: Hymenoptera
- Family: Formicidae
- Genus: Pseudomyrmex
- Species: P. seminole

Binomial name
- Pseudomyrmex seminole Ward, 1985

= Pseudomyrmex seminole =

Species of ant

Pseudomyrmex seminole is a species of ant in the family Formicidae.

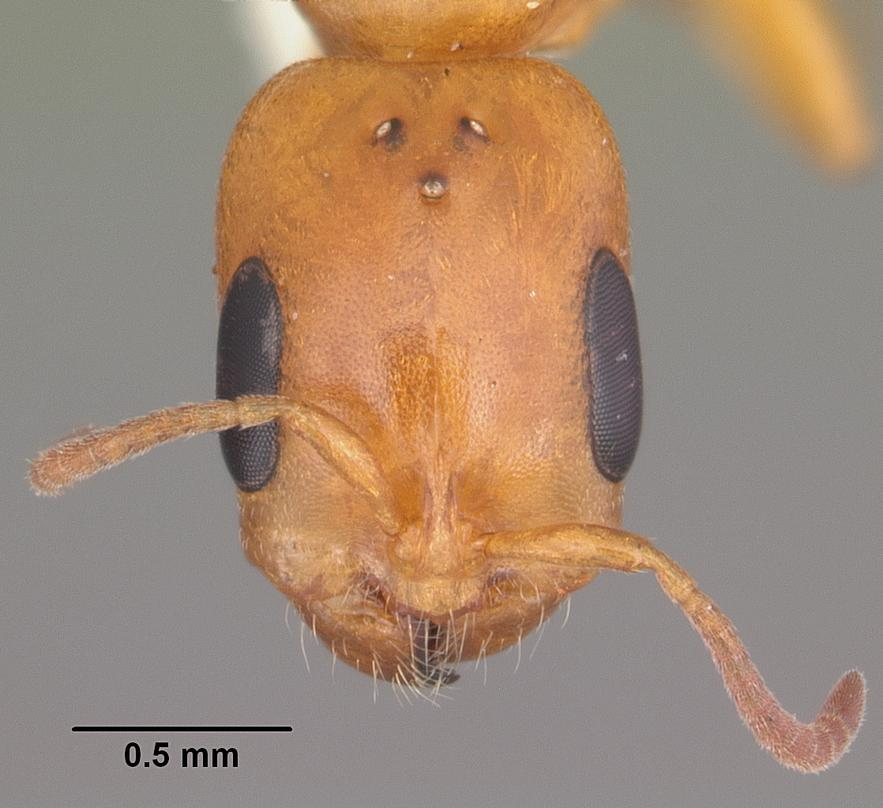

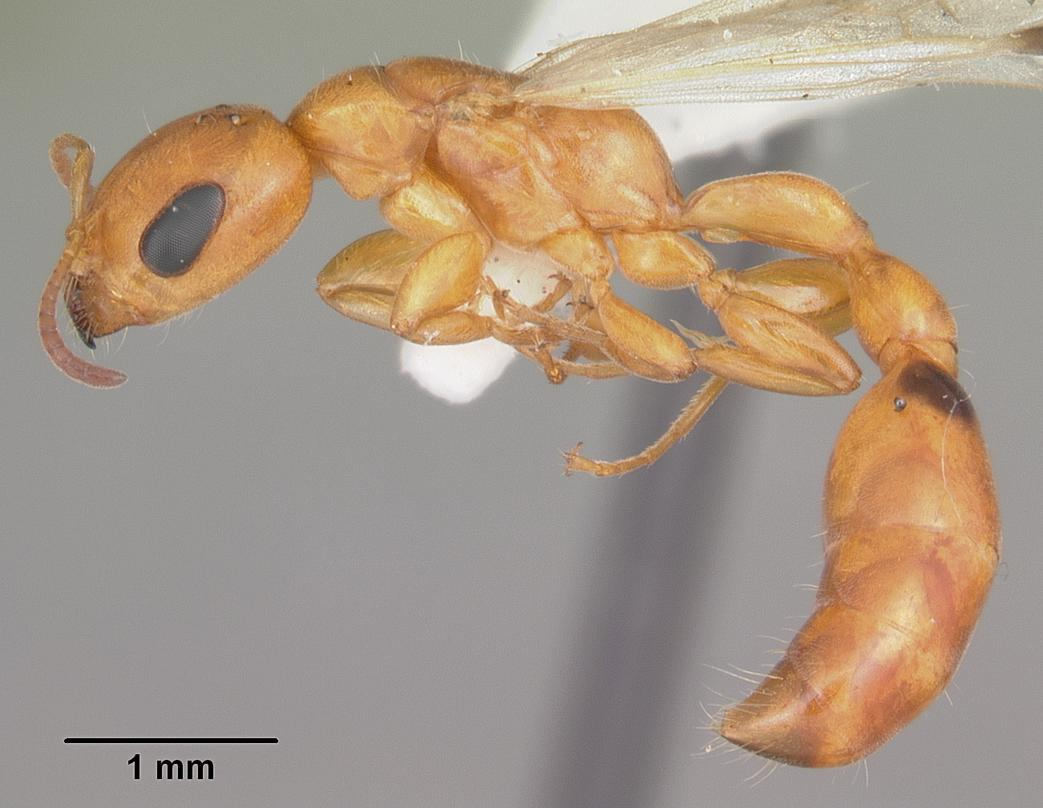
