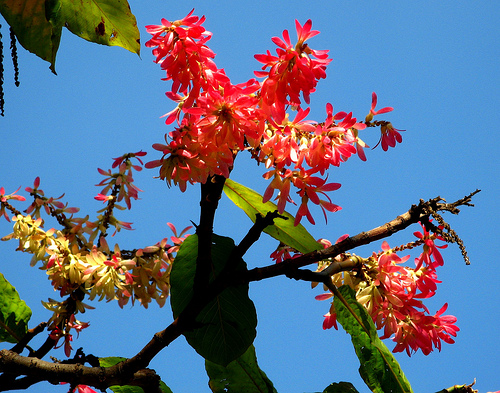
- Triplaris brasiliensis flowers - Sao Paulo Brasil

Scientific classification
- Kingdom: Plantae
- Clade: Tracheophytes
- Clade: Angiosperms
- Clade: Eudicots
- Order: Caryophyllales
- Family: Polygonaceae
- Tribe: Triplarideae
- Genus: Triplaris; Loefl. ex L.

Species
- See text

Synonyms
- Blochmannia Rchb.; Vellasquezia Bertol.

= Triplaris =

Genus of flowering plants

Triplaris is a genus of plants in the family Polygonaceae. Ant tree is a common name for plants in this genus.

The species native to the Americas, ranging from southeastern Mexico through Central America and tropical South America to Bolivia, Paraguay, and southern Brazil. Some species are used for lumber. They are dioecious pioneer species.

== Species ==
19 species are accepted.

- Triplaris americana L.
- Triplaris caracasana Cham.
- Triplaris cumingiana Fisch. & C.A.Mey.
- Triplaris dugandii Brandbyge
- Triplaris efistulifera Britton ex Rusby
- Triplaris fulva Huber
- Triplaris gardneriana Wedd.
- Triplaris longifolia Huber
- Triplaris mato-grossensis Brandbyge
- Triplaris melaenodendron (Bertol.) Standl. & Steyerm.
- Triplaris moyobambensis Brandbyge
- Triplaris peruviana Fisch. & Meyer ex C.A. Meyer
- Triplaris physocalyx Brandbyge
- Triplaris poeppigiana Wedd.
- Triplaris punctata Standl.
- Triplaris purdiei Meisn.
- Triplaris setosa Rusby
- Triplaris vestita Rusby
- Triplaris weigeltiana (Rchb.) Kuntze
