= Pidaung Wildlife Sanctuary =

Protected area in Myanmar

- IUCN category IV (habitat/species management area)
- Location within Myanmar
- Location: Myitkyina Township, Kachin State, Myanmar
- Coordinates: 25°29′N 97°10′E
- Area: 122.07 km^{2} (47.13 sq mi)
- Established: 1927
- Governing body: Nature and Wildlife Conservation Division

Pidaung Wildlife Sanctuary is a protected area in Myanmar's Kachin State, covering 122.07 km^{2} (47.13 sq mi) at an elevation of 155–665 m (509–2,182 ft) in Myitkyina Township.

Pidaung Wildlife Sanctuary was initially demarcated with an area of 670 km^{2} (260 sq mi). Between the early 1960s and 1993, its size was reduced because of the expansion of sugar cane plantations, deforestation due to security reasons, construction of roads, railways and settlements. Wildlife diminished as a result.

The sanctuary harbours the orchid species Malaxis latifolia, Arundina graminifolia, Spathoglottis affinis and Spathoglottis plicata.
