= Namkwi =

- Location in Burma
- Coordinates: 25°26′N 97°21′E
- Country: Burma
- State: Kachin State
- District: Myitkyina District
- Township: Myitkyina Township

Population (2005)
  - Religions: Buddhism
- Time zone: UTC+6.30 (UTC + 6:30)

Namkwi is a village in Myitkyina Township in Myitkyina District in the Kachin State of north-eastern Burma. It is located 4 miles from the city of Myitkyina.

Nearby towns and villages include Auche (13.7 nm), Hpaochan (13.4 nm), Seingneing (10.0 nm), Namyu (7.2 nm), Charpate (1.8 nm), Namponmao (5.7 nm), Naunghi(4.1 nm), Pamati (4.1 nm).
