= Radhapur =

Radhapur may refer to:

- Radhapur, Nepal
- Radhapur, near Chārpāte, Kachin, Burma

== See also ==
- Radhanpur, Gujarat, India
- Radhapuram (disambiguation)
