= Second War Allied Forces Memorial Monument =

War memorial in Myanmar

Coordinates: 25°25′47.52″N 97°23′51.74″E

The Second War Allied Forces Memorial Monument (Chinese: 二戰盟軍中國遠徵軍忠魂碑) is a monument in Myanmar that commemorates the Allied forces and the Chinese Expeditionary Force. It was completed on November 10, 2014, by the Yunnan Association of Myitkyina with funds raised by the descendants of the Chinese Expeditionary Force soldiers and overseas Chinese in Myanmar.

It is located at a Chinese cemetery in Myitkyina Township, Kachin State.

== See also ==
- Chinese Monument Ground
