= Spathoglottis arunachalensis =

Conservation status
- Critically Endangered (IUCN 3.1)

Scientific classification
- Kingdom: Plantae
- Clade: Tracheophytes
- Clade: Angiosperms
- Clade: Monocots
- Order: Asparagales
- Family: Orchidaceae
- Subfamily: Epidendroideae
- Genus: Spathoglottis
- Species: S. arunachalensis

Binomial name
- Spathoglottis arunachalensis Tsering & K.Prasad

Species of orchid

Spathoglottis arunachalensis is a species of Critically endangered orchid found in India. It is also named as the lost spathoglottis.

== Description ==
This orchid is a terrestrial herb with 2 to 4 leaves. The inflorescence is 20 to 30 cm long and raceme. The flowers are yellow in color and the stalk is pale greenish-yellow. The petals are 10 to 11 mm long and rounded at apex. The long lip of the flower is 7.5 to 8 mm. It resembles Spathoglottis ixioides but can be differentiated by longer inflorescence, smaller flowers and the presence of hairs in the inner surface of the sepals along with other characteristics.

== Distribution ==
This orchid was found inside Sessa Orchid Sanctuary in 2016 in Arunachal Pradesh and formally described in 2020. It is known to occur only in the sanctuary.

== Etymology ==
This species was named after the state of Arunachal Pradesh where it was discovered.

== Ecology ==
This species flowers between September and October.

== Conservation and threats ==
In 2016, a population of 200 individuals were seen. However in 2020 survey this species was never seen and its habitat was destructed due to the construction of Trans-Arunachal Highway. Fearing it is lost, the species was given its common name The Lost Spathoglottis and the authorities at The Orchid Research Centre at Tipi announced a 10,000 rupees cash award for anyone who can find the species.

Habitat loss due to road construction, shifting agriculture, logging are some of the threats for this species.
