= Spathoglottis jetsuniae =

Scientific classification
- Kingdom: Plantae
- Clade: Tracheophytes
- Clade: Angiosperms
- Clade: Monocots
- Order: Asparagales
- Family: Orchidaceae
- Subfamily: Epidendroideae
- Genus: Spathoglottis
- Species: S. jetsuniae

Binomial name
- Spathoglottis jetsuniae Gyeltshen, Tobgay & Dalström

Species of flowering plant

Spathoglottis jetsuniae is a species of flowering plant in the family Orchidaceae. It has pseudobulbs and white to bluish-magenta flowers. The species is native to Bhutan, and was described in 2017.

== Taxonomy ==
The species was described by Nima Gyeltshen, Kezang Tobgay, and Stig Dalström in 2017. It is most closely related to Spathoglottis hardingiana.

== Distribution ==
Spathoglottis jetsuniae is native to the subtropical biome of Bhutan. It grows in shallow soil with a pH of 7.1-7.8, and at elevations of 980–1,000 metres (3,220–3,280 ft). Spathoglottis jetsuniae is often found near Paphiopedilum fairrieanum.

== Description ==
Spathoglottis jetsuniae is a herb with fibrous roots, which are 1–2 millimetres (0.039–0.079 in) thick. It has pseudobulbs, which are globose-ovoid, around 2.5 centimetres (0.98 in) long, and around 2 centimetres (0.79 in) wide. The leaves are oblanceolate, around 34 centimetres (13 in) long, and around 4 centimetres (1.6 in) wide.

The inflorescence is a slender raceme with many flowers. The flowers are 2.5–2.8 centimetres (0.98–1.10 in) wide. The dorsal sepal is elliptical, around 14 millimetres (0.55 in) long, and around 6 millimetres (0.24 in) wide. The lateral sepals are 13–13.5 millimetres (0.51–0.53 in) long, and 6–6.5 millimetres (0.24–0.26 in) wide. The dorsal sepal, lateral sepals, and petals are elliptical, white, and turn bluish-magenta with maturity. The lip is shallowly concave, and has three lobes. The column is slender, and around 14 millimetres (0.55 in) long.

== Etymology ==
Spathoglottis jetsuniae is named after Jetsun Pema, the Queen of Bhutan.
