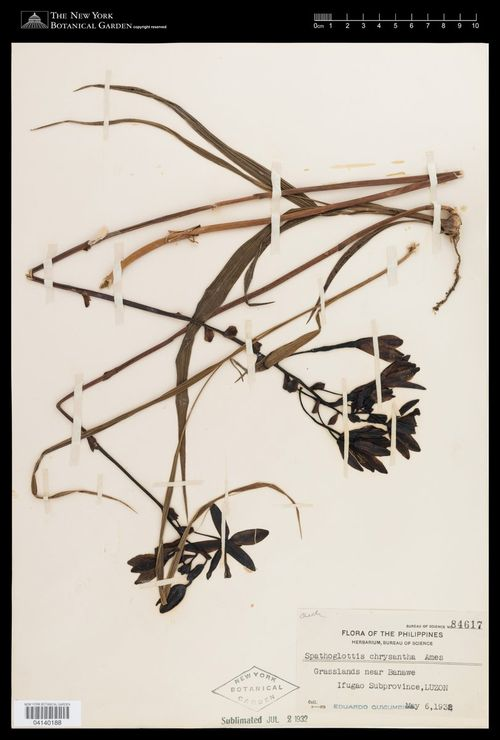

Conservation status
- CITES Appendix II

Scientific classification
- Kingdom: Plantae
- Clade: Embryophytes
- Clade: Tracheophytes
- Clade: Spermatophytes
- Clade: Angiosperms
- Clade: Monocots
- Order: Asparagales
- Family: Orchidaceae
- Subfamily: Epidendroideae
- Genus: Spathoglottis
- Species: S. chrysantha

Binomial name
- Spathoglottis chrysantha Ames

= Spathoglottis chrysantha =

Species of flowering plant

Spathoglottis chrysantha is a species of flowering plant in the family Orchidaceae. The species is native to the wet tropical biome of the Philippines. It was described in 1908, by Oakes Ames.

== Description ==
Spathoglottis chrysantha has sinewy leaves. The flowers are 3–4 centimetres (1.2–1.6 in) in diameter. The plant has underground storage organs.

== Conservation ==
Spathoglottis chrysantha is listed in Appendix II of CITES. There are no quotas or suspensions in place for the species.
