= Spathoglottis micronesiaca =

Conservation status
- CITES Appendix II

Scientific classification
- Kingdom: Plantae
- Clade: Tracheophytes
- Clade: Angiosperms
- Clade: Monocots
- Order: Asparagales
- Family: Orchidaceae
- Subfamily: Epidendroideae
- Genus: Spathoglottis
- Species: S. micronesiaca

Binomial name
- Spathoglottis micronesiaca Schltr.

Species of flowering plant

Spathoglottis micronesiaca, commonly known as the Micronesian ground orchid, is a species of flowering plant in the family Orchidaceae. It is a perennial herb native to islands in the north-west Pacific. The species was described in 1914, and is listed in Appendix II of CITES.

== Taxonomy ==
The species was described by Rudolf Schlechter in 1914.

== Distribution ==
Spathoglottis micronesiaca is native to the wet tropical biome of the Caroline Islands and the Mariana Islands.

== Description ==
Spathoglottis micronesiaca is a perennial herb. It has underground pseudobulbs.

== Conservation ==
Spathoglottis micronesiaca is listed in Appendix II of CITES. There are no quotas or suspensions in place for the species.
