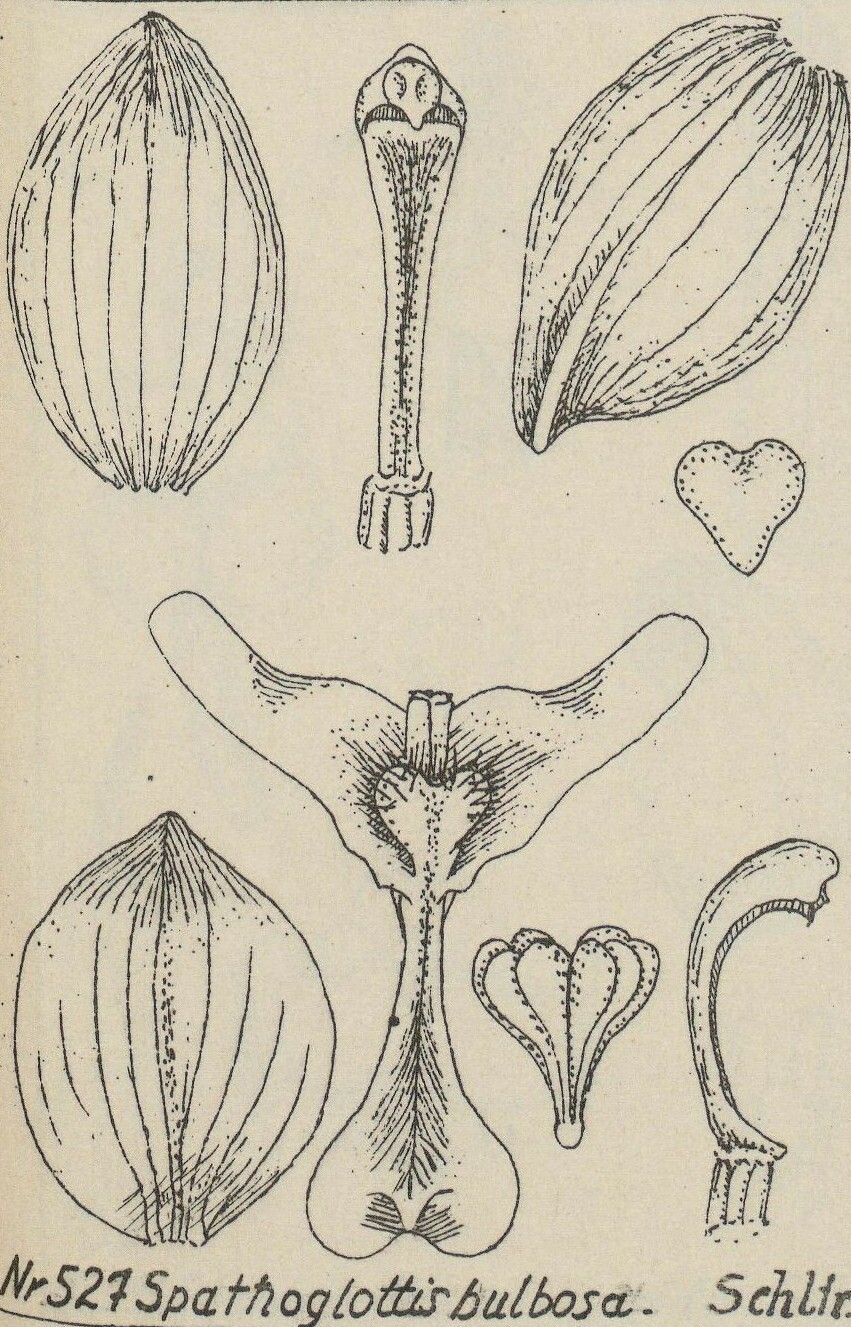

Conservation status
- CITES Appendix II

Scientific classification
- Kingdom: Plantae
- Clade: Embryophytes
- Clade: Tracheophytes
- Clade: Spermatophytes
- Clade: Angiosperms
- Clade: Monocots
- Order: Asparagales
- Family: Orchidaceae
- Subfamily: Epidendroideae
- Genus: Spathoglottis
- Species: S. bulbosa

Binomial name
- Spathoglottis bulbosa Schltr.

= Spathoglottis bulbosa =

Species of orchid

Spathoglottis bulbosa is a species of flowering plant in the family Orchidaceae. It is a pseudobulbous plant native to Papua New Guinea. The species was described in 1912, and is listed in Appendix II of CITES.

== Taxonomy ==
The species was described by Rudolf Schlechter in 1912.

== Distribution ==
Spathoglottis bulbosa is native to the wet tropical biome of Papua New Guinea.

== Description ==
Spathoglottis bulbosa has underground pseudobulbs.

== Conservation ==
Spathoglottis bulbosa is listed in Appendix II of CITES. There are no quotas or suspensions in place for the species.
