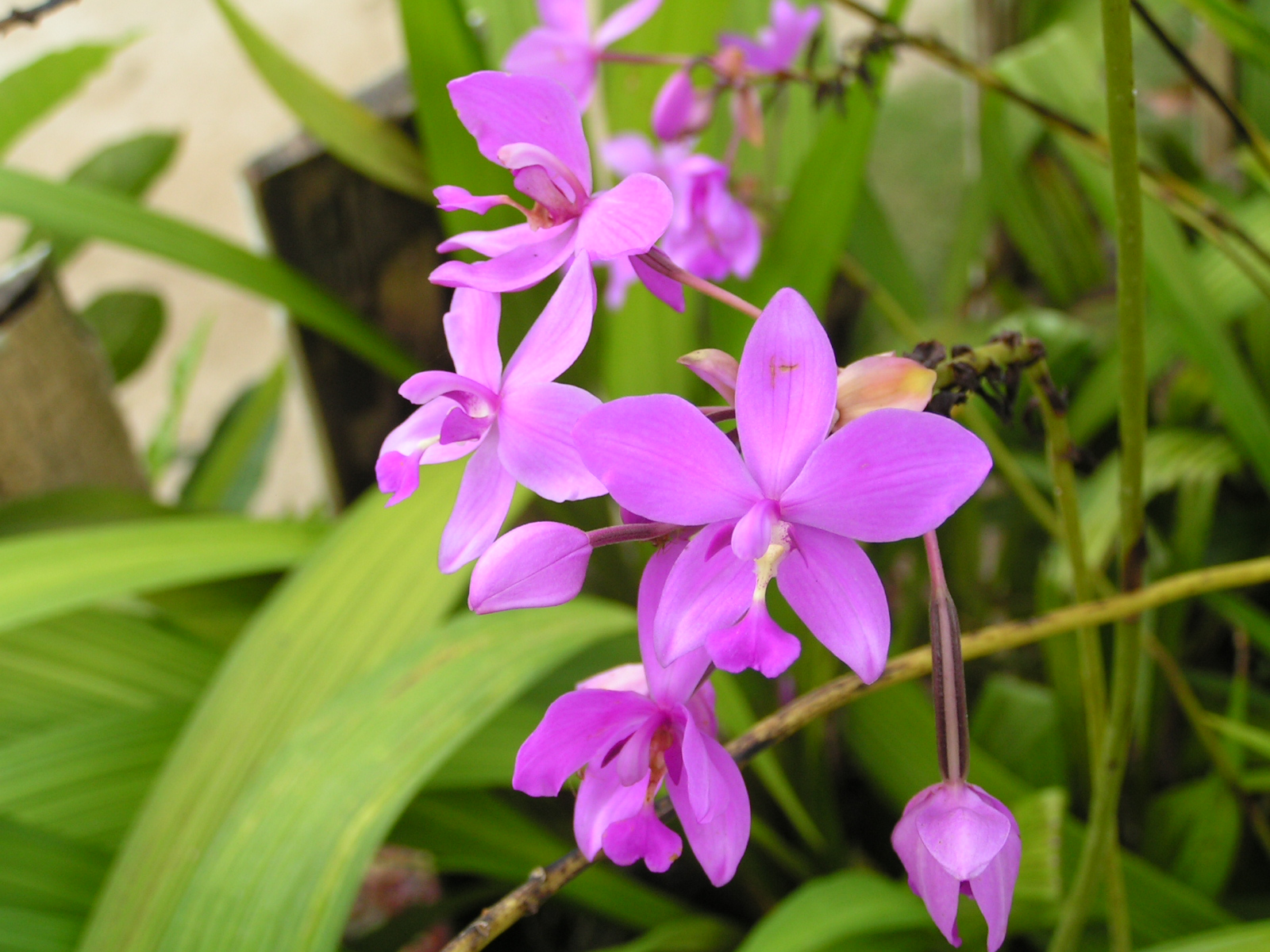
- Spathoglottis plicata (Philippine ground orchid)

Scientific classification
- Kingdom: Plantae
- Clade: Tracheophytes
- Clade: Angiosperms
- Clade: Monocots
- Order: Asparagales
- Family: Orchidaceae
- Subfamily: Epidendroideae
- Tribe: Collabieae
- Genus: Spathoglottis; Blume

Type species
- Spathoglottis plicata

Synonyms
- Paxtonia Lindl.

= Spathoglottis =

Purple orchids

Genus of orchids

Spathoglottis, commonly known as purple orchids, is a genus of about fifty species of orchids in the family Orchidaceae. They are evergreen terrestrial herbs with crowded pseudobulbs, a small number of leaves and medium-sized resupinate flowers on an upright flowering stem. The sepals and petals are all similar to each other and are white, yellow, pink or purple. Species of Spathoglottis are found from eastern and south-eastern Asia to Australia and some Pacific Islands.

== Description ==
Orchids in the genus Spathoglottis are evergreen, terrestrial herbs with crowded pseudobulbs just below the surface of the soil and a few large, pleated leaves. The flowering stem emerges from a pseudobulb and bears medium-sized, colourful flowers. The flowers open widely with the sepals and petals all similar in size to each other, although with the petals usually broader, the sepals are hairy on the outside. The labellum has three lobes, the side lobes more or less upright and the middle lobe with a claw near its base.

== Taxonomy and naming ==
The genus Spathoglottis was first formally described in 1825 by Carl Ludwig Blume who published the description in Bijdragen tot de flora van Nederlandsch Indië, and the first species he described (the type species) was S. plicata. The genus name Spathoglottis is derived from the Greek spathe, spathe, and glotta, tongue, a probable reference to the broad labellum midlobe".

=== Species list ===
Species accepted by the Plants of the World Online as of October 2025 are:

- Spathoglottis affinis de Vriese
- Spathoglottis albida Kraenzl.
- Spathoglottis arunachalensis Tsering & K.Prasad
- Spathoglottis aurea Lindl.
- Spathoglottis bulbosa Schltr.
- Spathoglottis carolinensis Schltr.
- Spathoglottis chrysantha Ames
- Spathoglottis chrysodorus T. Green
- Spathoglottis confusa J.J.Sm.
- Spathoglottis doctersii J.J.Sm.
- Spathoglottis eburnea Gagnep.
- Spathoglottis elmeri Ames
- Spathoglottis elobulata J.J.Sm.
- Spathoglottis erectiflora Kraenzl.
- Spathoglottis gracilis Rolfe ex Hook.f.
- Spathoglottis hardingiana C.S.P.Parish & Rchb.f.
- Spathoglottis ixioides (D.Don) Lindl.
- Spathoglottis jetsuniae Gyeltshen, Tobgyel & Dalström
- Spathoglottis kenejiae Schltr.
- Spathoglottis kimballiana Hook.f.
  - Spathoglottis kimballiana var. angustifolia Ames
  - Spathoglottis kimballiana var. antiquensis T.Green
  - Spathoglottis kimballiana var. kimballiana
- Spathoglottis latifolia (Gaudich.) Garay & Ormerod
- Spathoglottis lobbii Rchb.f.
- Spathoglottis microchilina Kraenzl.
- Spathoglottis micronesiaca Schltr.
- Spathoglottis pacifica Rchb.f.
- Spathoglottis palawanensis Lubag-Arquiza
- Spathoglottis papuana F.M.Bailey
- Spathoglottis × parsonii Ames & Quisumb.
- Spathoglottis parviflora Kraenzl.
- Spathoglottis paulinae F.Muell.
- Spathoglottis petri Rchb.f.
- Spathoglottis philippinensis Lubag-Arquiza
- Spathoglottis plicata Blume
- Spathoglottis portus-finschii Kraenzl.
- Spathoglottis pubescens Lindl.
- Spathoglottis pulchra Schltr.
- Spathoglottis smithii Kores
- Spathoglottis sulawesiensis T. Green
- Spathoglottis tomentosa Lindl.
- Spathoglottis tricallosa J.J.Sm.
- Spathoglottis unguiculata (Labill.) Rchb.f.
- Spathoglottis vanoverberghii Ames
- Spathoglottis vanvuurenii J.J.Sm.
- Spathoglottis velutina Schltr.

== Distribution and habitat ==
Spathoglottis orchids usually grow in moist places in forest, grassland and swamps, usually in bright sunshine. They are found in India, China, the Philippines, Malaysia, Indonesia, New Guinea, New Caledonia, the Solomon Islands, Borneo and Cape York Peninsula in Australia. One species is endemic to Australia and three to China.

== Use in horticulture ==
In the tropics, Spathoglottis are popular garden plants. They are easy to cultivate and sought after for their large colourful flowers, and are common in tropical gardens. They need sun for part of the day, well-drained loamy soil and regular water.

== Etymology ==
Spathoglottis is derived from the Greek spathe (blade) and glotta (tongue). The name refers to the shape of the lip.

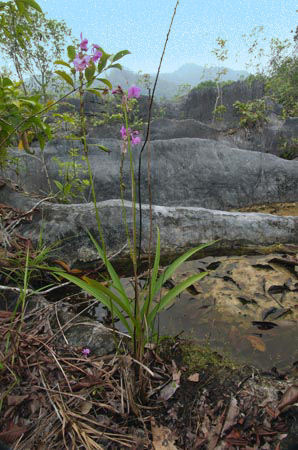
Spathoglottis sp. from Sarawak, Borneo

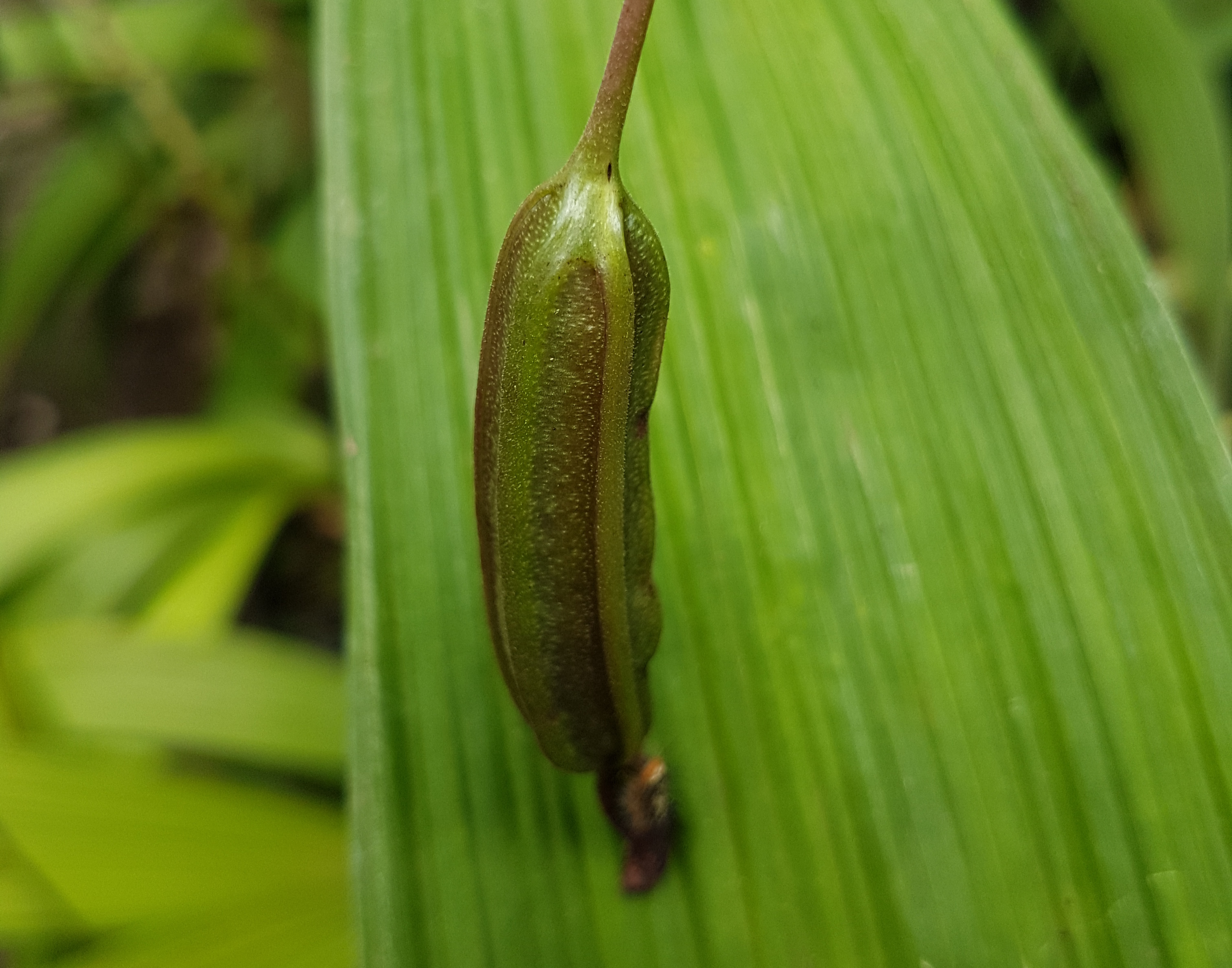
Spathoglottis plicata capsule

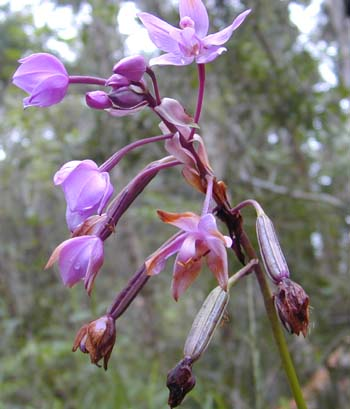
Spathoglottis plicata flowers and fruits at various stages of development

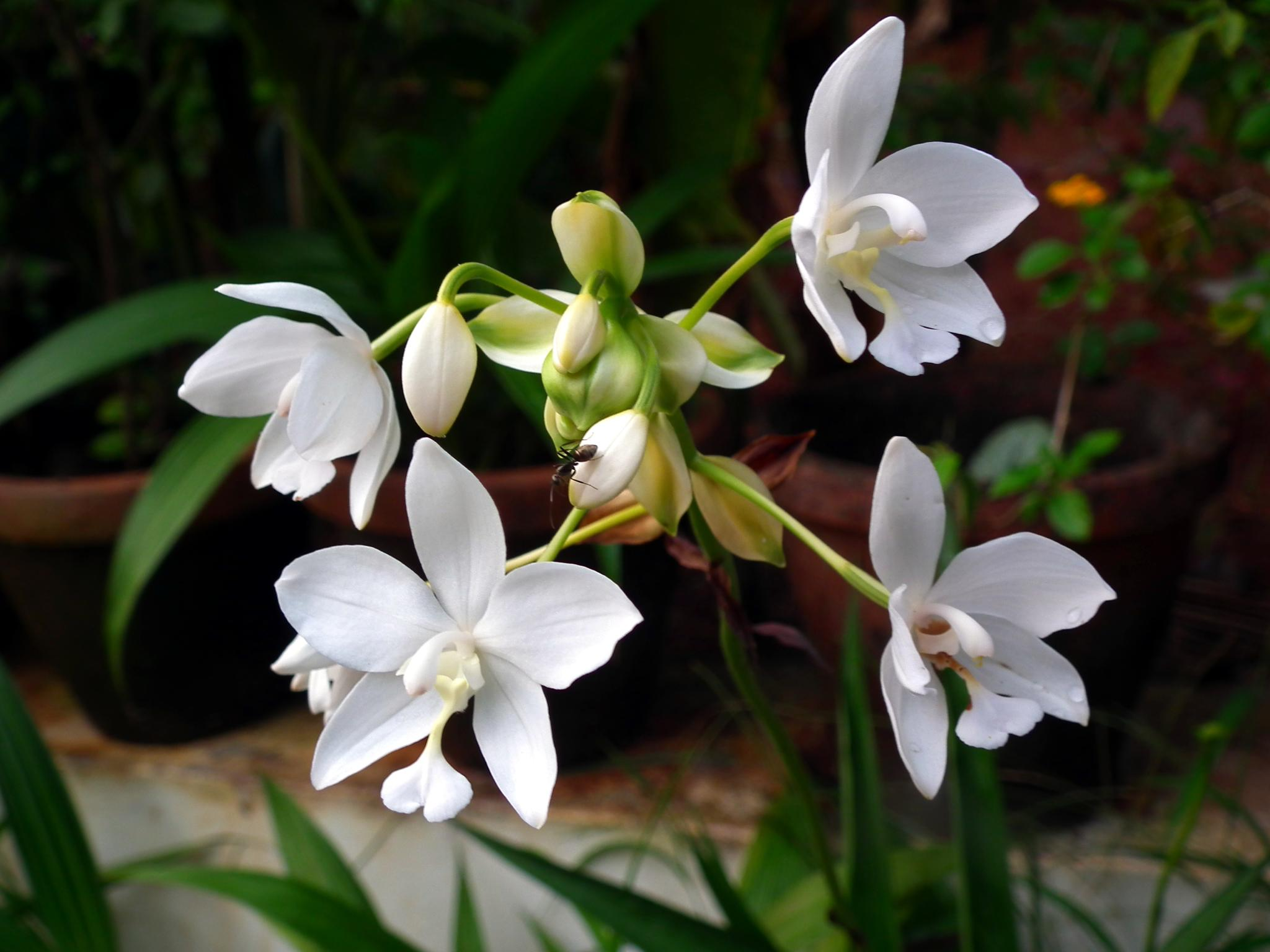
Spathoglottis plicata white cultivar
