= Spathoglottis chrysodorus =

Conservation status
- CITES Appendix II

Scientific classification
- Kingdom: Plantae
- Clade: Embryophytes
- Clade: Tracheophytes
- Clade: Spermatophytes
- Clade: Angiosperms
- Clade: Monocots
- Order: Asparagales
- Family: Orchidaceae
- Subfamily: Epidendroideae
- Genus: Spathoglottis
- Species: S. chrysodorus

Binomial name
- Spathoglottis chrysodorus T.Green

Species of flowering plant

Spathoglottis chrysodorus is a species of flowering plant in the family Orchidaceae. It is native to New Guinea. The species was described in 2002, and is listed in Appendix II of CITES.

== Taxonomy ==
The species was named by Ted Green in 2002. The description was published in Orchid Digest.

== Distribution ==
Spathoglottis chrysodorus is native to the wet tropical biome of western New Guinea.

== Description ==
Spathoglottis chrysodorus has underground storage organs (pseudobulbs).

== Conservation ==
Spathoglottis chrysodorus is listed in Appendix II of CITES. There are no suspensions or quotas in place for the species.
