= Spathoglottis erectiflora =

Conservation status
- CITES Appendix II

Scientific classification
- Kingdom: Plantae
- Clade: Embryophytes
- Clade: Tracheophytes
- Clade: Spermatophytes
- Clade: Angiosperms
- Clade: Monocots
- Order: Asparagales
- Family: Orchidaceae
- Subfamily: Epidendroideae
- Genus: Spathoglottis
- Species: S. erectiflora

Binomial name
- Spathoglottis erectiflora Schltr.

Species of flowering plant

Spathoglottis erectiflora is a species of flowering plant in the family Orchidaceae. It is native to Papua New Guinea. The species was described in 1921, and is listed in Appendix II of CITES.

== Taxonomy ==
The species was named by Friedrich Richard Rudolf Schlechter in 1921.

== Distribution ==
It is native to the wet tropical biome of Papua New Guinea.

== Description ==
Spathoglottis erectiflora has underground storage organs (pseudobulbs). It grows to around 80 centimetres (2.6 ft) tall.

== Conservation ==
Spathoglottis erectiflora is listed in Appendix II of CITES. There are no quotas or suspensions in place for the species.
