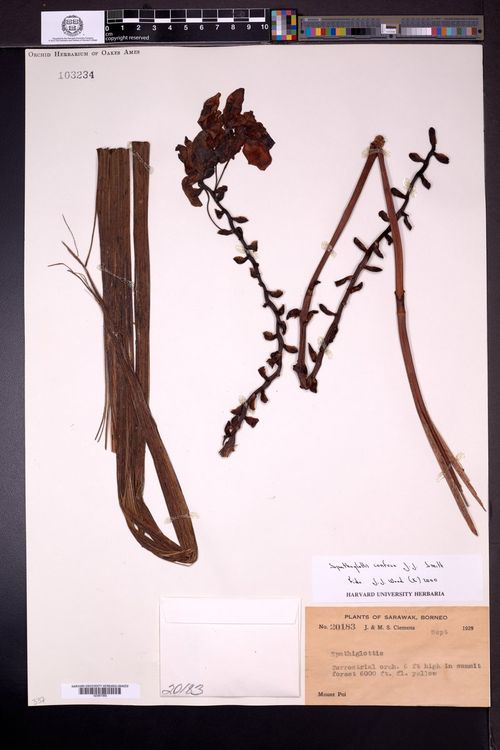

Conservation status
- CITES Appendix II

Scientific classification
- Kingdom: Plantae
- Clade: Embryophytes
- Clade: Tracheophytes
- Clade: Spermatophytes
- Clade: Angiosperms
- Clade: Monocots
- Order: Asparagales
- Family: Orchidaceae
- Subfamily: Epidendroideae
- Genus: Spathoglottis
- Species: S. confusa

Binomial name
- Spathoglottis confusa J.J.Sm.

= Spathoglottis confusa =

Species of flowering plant

Spathoglottis confusa is a species of flowering plant in the family Orchidaceae. It is native to Borneo. The species was described in 1932, and is listed in Appendix II of CITES.

== Taxonomy ==
The species was described by Johannes Jacobus Smith in 1932.

== Distribution ==
Spathoglottis confusa is native to the wet tropical biome of Borneo.

== Description ==
Spathoglottis confusa has underground storage organs (pseudobulbs).

== Conservation ==
Spathoglottis confusa is listed in Appendix II of CITES. There are no suspensions or quotas in place for the species.
