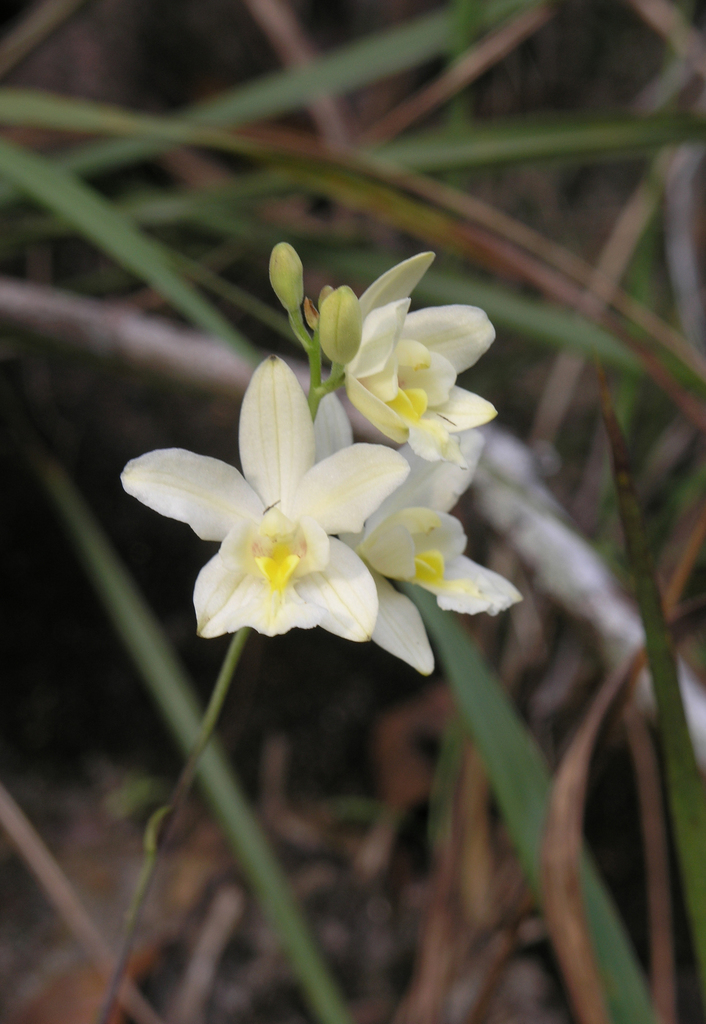

Conservation status
- CITES Appendix II

Scientific classification
- Kingdom: Plantae
- Clade: Embryophytes
- Clade: Tracheophytes
- Clade: Angiosperms
- Clade: Monocots
- Order: Asparagales
- Family: Orchidaceae
- Subfamily: Epidendroideae
- Genus: Spathoglottis
- Species: S. eburnea

Binomial name
- Spathoglottis eburnea Gagnep.

= Spathoglottis eburnea =

Species of flowering plant

Spathoglottis eburnea is a species of flowering plant in the family Orchidaceae. It is a pseudobulbous plant with lanceolate to linear leaves, and cream and white flowers. The species is native to south-east Asia.

Spathoglottis eburnea was described in 1931, and is listed in Appendix II of CITES.

== Taxonomy ==
The species was described by François Gagnepain in 1931.

== Distribution ==
Spathoglottis eburnea is native to the wet tropical biome of Cambodia, Laos, Thailand, and Vietnam. The species grows in deciduous forests, at elevations of 190–350 metres (620–1,150 ft).

== Description ==
Spathoglottis eburnea has round or conical pseudobulbs. The flowering shoots are 34–58 centimetres (13–23 in) tall.

The plant has two or three narrowly lanceolate to linear leaves, which are 16–40 centimetres (6.3–15.7 in) long, and 0.6–1.1 centimetres (0.24–0.43 in) wide. The leaf stems are 7–9 centimetres (2.8–3.5 in) long. The plant has four to seven sterile bracts.

The inflorescences are loose, purple, and covered in short soft hairs. The flower stems are 16–51 centimetres (6.3–20.1 in) long. The flowers are cream-coloured or white, and the base of the labellum is yellow. The sepals are elliptic to lanceolate, 17–22 millimetres (0.67–0.87 in) long, 6.5–10 millimetres (0.26–0.39 in) wide, and covered in short soft hairs. The petals are elliptical, 17–22 millimetres (0.67–0.87 in) long, and 8–12 millimetres (0.31–0.47 in) wide. The labellum has three lobes, which are 15–19 millimetres (0.59–0.75 in) long, and 13–17 millimetres (0.51–0.67 in) wide. The plant flowers from September to November.

The column is 7–11 millimetres (0.28–0.43 in) long, curved, and slender at the base. The fruit is an ellipsoid capsule with short soft hairs, around 15 millimetres (0.59 in) long, and 7 millimetres (0.28 in) wide.

== Conservation ==
Spathoglottis eburnea is listed in Appendix II of CITES. There are suspensions on its export from Laos.

== Nomenclature ==
In Thai, the species is known as บานดึก (ban duk).
