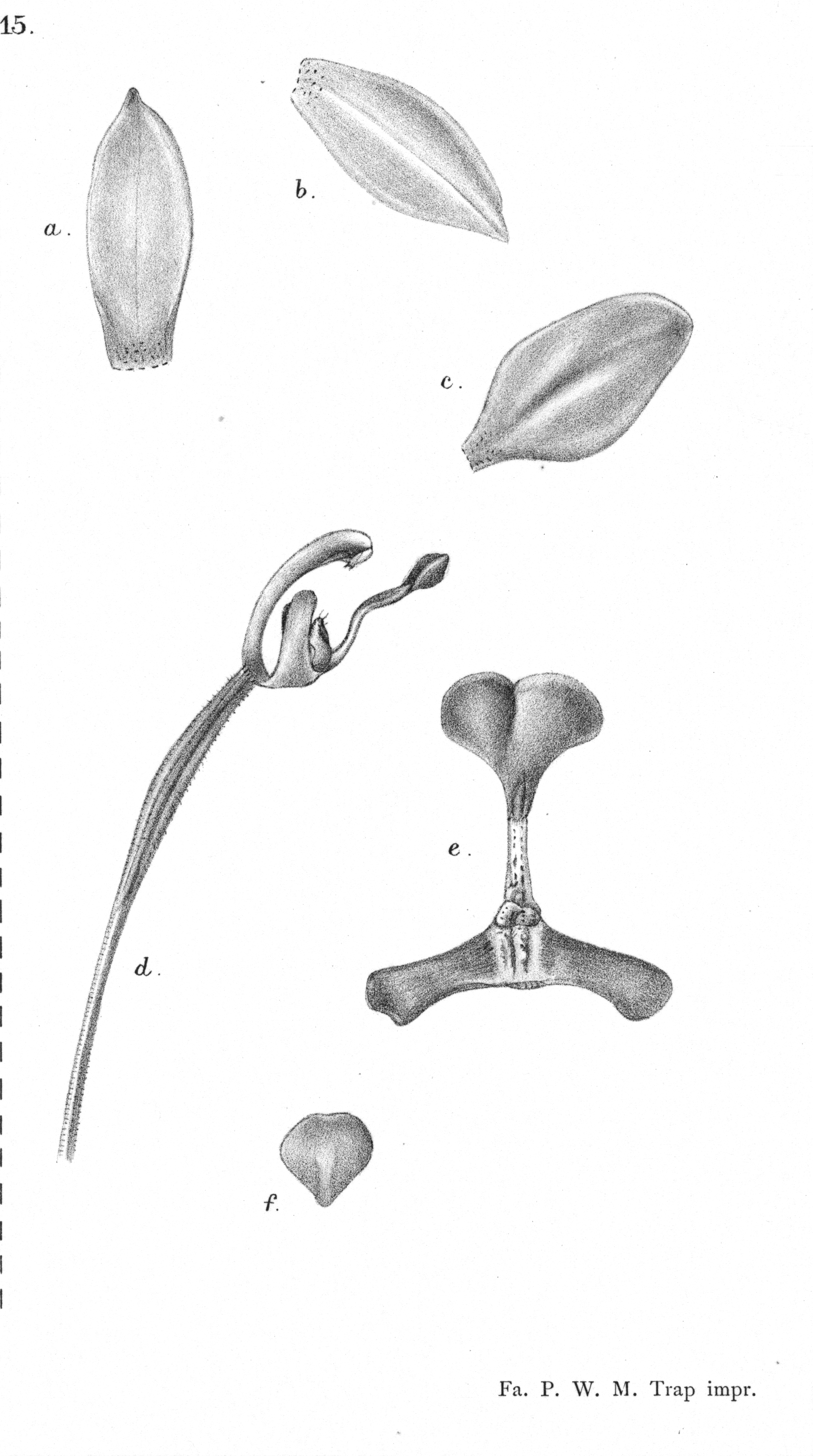
- Illustration

Conservation status
- CITES Appendix II

Scientific classification
- Kingdom: Plantae
- Clade: Embryophytes
- Clade: Tracheophytes
- Clade: Spermatophytes
- Clade: Angiosperms
- Clade: Monocots
- Order: Asparagales
- Family: Orchidaceae
- Subfamily: Epidendroideae
- Genus: Spathoglottis
- Species: S. elobulata

Binomial name
- Spathoglottis elobulata J.J.Sm.

= Spathoglottis elobulata =

Species of flowering plant

Spathoglottis elobulata is a species of flowering plant in the family Orchidaceae. It is a geophyte native to New Guinea. The species was described in 1929, and is listed in Appendix II of CITES.

== Taxonomy ==
Spathoglottis elobulata was described by Johannes Jacobus Smith in 1929.

== Distribution ==
Spathoglottis elobulata is native to western New Guinea.

== Description ==
Spathoglottis elobulata has underground storage organs (pseudobulbs).

== Conservation ==
Spathoglottis elobulata is listed in Appendix II of CITES. There are no quotas or suspensions in place for the species.
