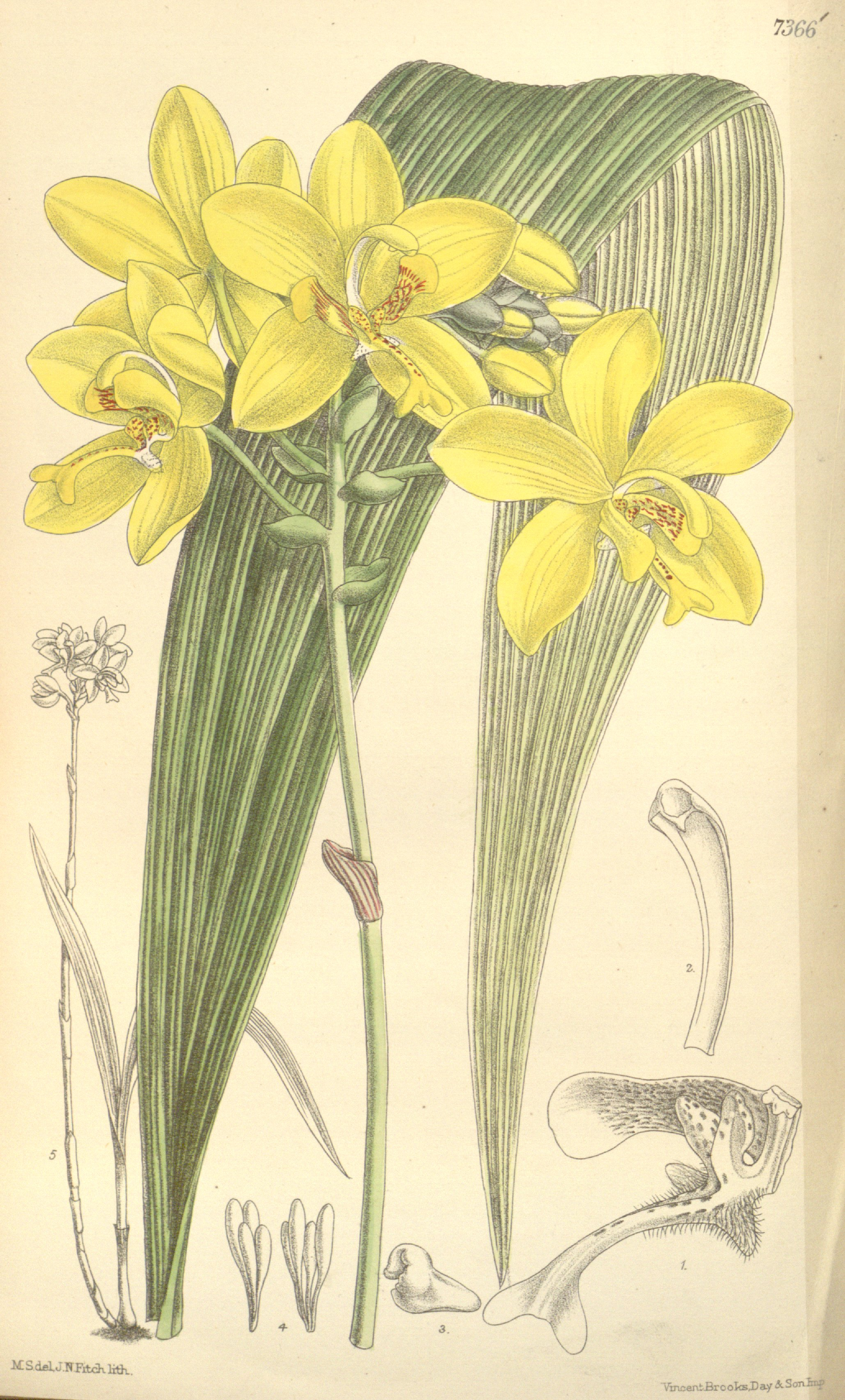
- Illustration

Conservation status
- CITES Appendix II

Scientific classification
- Kingdom: Plantae
- Clade: Embryophytes
- Clade: Tracheophytes
- Clade: Spermatophytes
- Clade: Angiosperms
- Clade: Monocots
- Order: Asparagales
- Family: Orchidaceae
- Subfamily: Epidendroideae
- Genus: Spathoglottis
- Species: S. gracilis

Binomial name
- Spathoglottis gracilis Rolfe ex Hook.f.

= Spathoglottis gracilis =

Species of flowering plant

Spathoglottis gracilis is a species of flowering plant in the family Orchidaceae. It is native to Malaysia and Borneo.

Spathoglottis gracilis is around 48 centimetres (19 in) tall, and has bright yellow flowers. It was described in 1894, and is listed in Appendix II of CITES.

== Taxonomy ==
The species was validly described by Robert Allen Rolfe in 1894, following an invalid use of the name by Joseph Dalton Hooker.

== Distribution ==
It is native to the wet tropical biome of Malaysia (Peninsular Malaysia, Sabah and Sarawak). It is either native to Thailand, or has been introduced there. (Note: World Flora Online lists the species as introduced. Plants of the World Online lists it as native.) In Borneo, it is found in hill and lower montane forests, and among rocks under bamboo.

The species grows at elevations of 800–1,700 metres (2,600–5,600 ft).

== Description ==
Spathoglottis gracilis is around 48 centimetres (19 in) tall.

The leaves are narrowly lanceolate, 29–40 centimetres (11–16 in) long, and 2–3 centimetres (0.79–1.18 in) wide. The leaf stalks are 8–9 centimetres (3.1–3.5 in) long.

The inflorescences are loose, and grow on stems around 38 centimetres (15 in) long. The flowers are bright yellow, and can be over 6 centimetres (2.4 in) in diameter. The sepals and petals are elliptical-ovate, and the sepals are covered in short, soft hairs. The labellum has three lobes.

It has underground storage organs (pseudobulbs), which are around 2 centimetres (0.79 in) thick.

== Conservation ==
Spathoglottis gracilis is listed in Appendix II of CITES. There are no quotas or suspensions in place for the species.
