= Spathoglottis microchilina =

Conservation status
- CITES Appendix II

Scientific classification
- Kingdom: Plantae
- Clade: Tracheophytes
- Clade: Angiosperms
- Clade: Monocots
- Order: Asparagales
- Family: Orchidaceae
- Subfamily: Epidendroideae
- Genus: Spathoglottis
- Species: S. microchilina

Binomial name
- Spathoglottis microchilina Kraenzl.

Species of flowering plant

Spathoglottis microchilina is a species of flowering plant in the family Orchidaceae. It is native to south-east Asia, and was described in 1893.

== Taxonomy ==
The species was described by Friedrich Wilhelm Ludwig Kraenzlin in 1893.

== Distribution ==
Spathoglottis microchilina is native to the wet tropical biome of Borneo, Malaya, and Sumatra.

== Description ==
Spathoglottis microchilina has underground pseudobulbs.

== Conservation ==
Spathoglottis microchilina is listed in Appendix II of CITES. There are no quotas or suspensions in place for the species.
