= Spathoglottis papuana =

Conservation status
- CITES Appendix II

Scientific classification
- Kingdom: Plantae
- Clade: Tracheophytes
- Clade: Angiosperms
- Clade: Monocots
- Order: Asparagales
- Family: Orchidaceae
- Subfamily: Epidendroideae
- Genus: Spathoglottis
- Species: S. papuana

Binomial name
- Spathoglottis papuana F.M.Bailey

Synonyms
- Spathoglottis lane-poolei R.S.Rogers

Species of flowering plant

Spathoglottis papuana is a species of flowering plant in the family Orchidaceae. The species is native to New Guinea, was described in 1892, and is listed in Appendix II of CITES.

== Taxonomy ==
The species was described by Frederick Manson Bailey in 1898.

== Distribution ==
Spathoglottis papuana is native to the wet tropical biome of New Guinea.

== Description ==
Spathoglottis papuana has underground pseudobulbs.

== Conservation ==
Spathoglottis papuana is listed in Appendix II of CITES. There are suspensions on the export of wild plants from Papua New Guinea.
