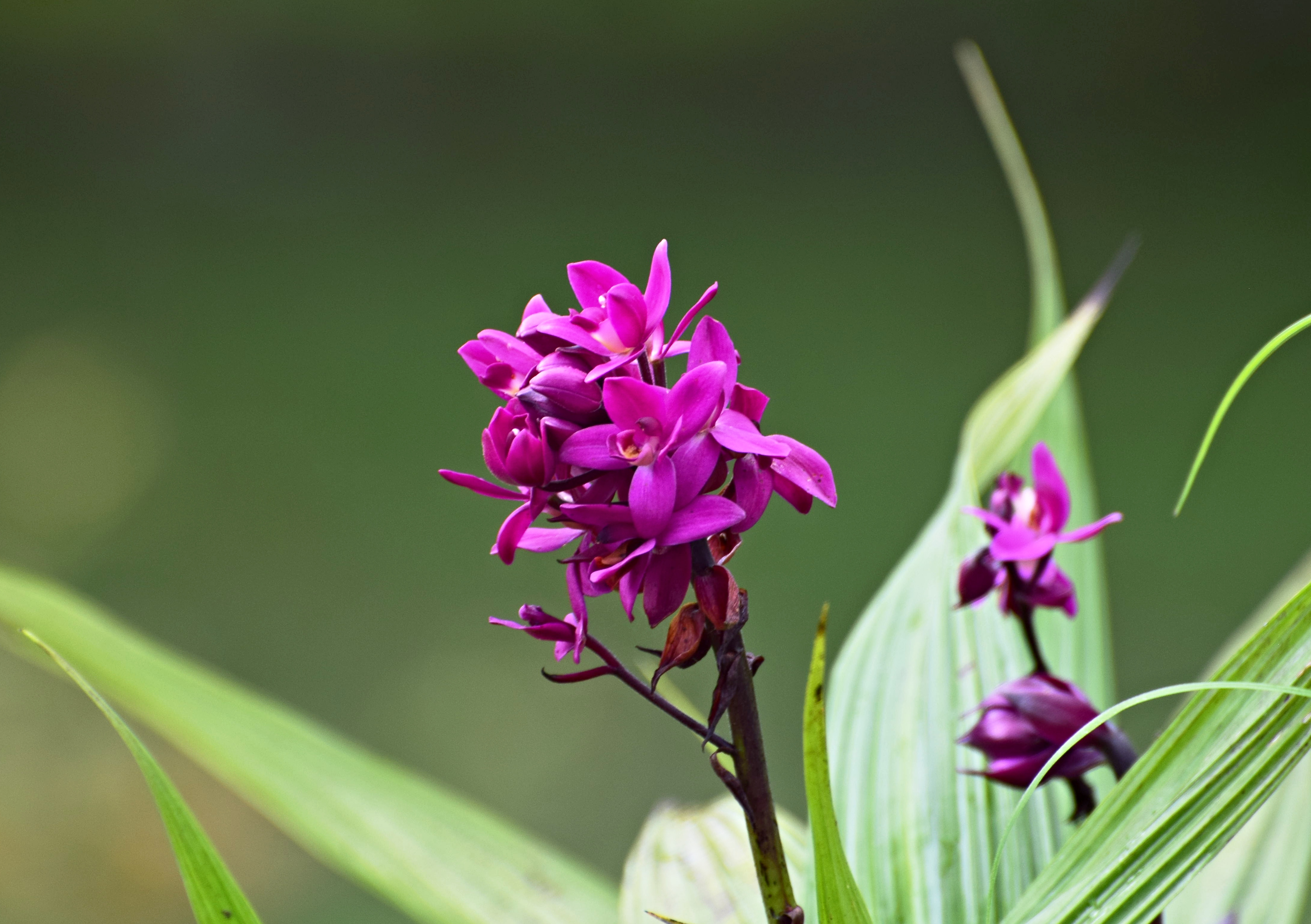

Conservation status
- CITES Appendix II

Scientific classification
- Kingdom: Plantae
- Clade: Embryophytes
- Clade: Tracheophytes
- Clade: Spermatophytes
- Clade: Angiosperms
- Clade: Monocots
- Order: Asparagales
- Family: Orchidaceae
- Subfamily: Epidendroideae
- Genus: Spathoglottis
- Species: S. unguiculata

Binomial name
- Spathoglottis unguiculata (Labill.) Rchb.f.

Synonyms
- Limodorum unguiculatum Labill.; Spathoglottis breviscapa Schltr.; Spathoglottis schinziana Kraenzl.

= Spathoglottis unguiculata =

Species of flowering plant

Spathoglottis unguiculata is a species of flowering plant in the family Orchidaceae. It has underground pseudobulbs.

The species is native to islands in the south-west Pacific. It was described in 1828, and is listed in Appendix II of CITES.

== Taxonomy ==
In 1828, Jacques Labillardière described Limodorum unguiculatum, a synonym of Spathoglottis unguiculata. The species' current name was first published in 1868, by Heinrich Gustav Reichenbach.

== Distribution ==
The species is native to the wet tropical biome of New Caledonia and Vanuatu. It may be present in Fiji and the Wallis and Futuna islands.

== Conservation ==
Spathoglottis unguiculata is listed in Appendix II of CITES. There are no quotas or suspensions in place for the species.
