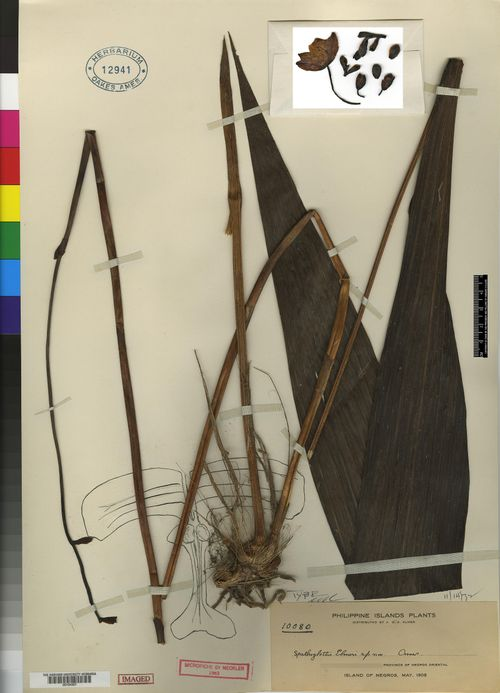

Conservation status
- CITES Appendix II

Scientific classification
- Kingdom: Plantae
- Clade: Embryophytes
- Clade: Tracheophytes
- Clade: Spermatophytes
- Clade: Angiosperms
- Clade: Monocots
- Order: Asparagales
- Family: Orchidaceae
- Subfamily: Epidendroideae
- Genus: Spathoglottis
- Species: S. elmeri

Binomial name
- Spathoglottis elmeri Ames

= Spathoglottis elmeri =

Species of flowering plant

Spathoglottis elmeri, commonly known as Elmer's ground orchid, is a species of flowering plant in the family Orchidaceae. It is native to the Philippines. The species was described in 1912, and is listed in Appendix II of CITES.

== Taxonomy ==
Spathoglottis elmeri was named by Oakes Ames in 1912.

== Distribution ==
Spathoglottis elmeri is native to the wet tropical biome of the Philippines. It is found on the islands of Mindoro and Negros.

== Description ==
Spathoglottis elmeri has underground storage organs (pseudobulbs).

== Conservation ==
Spathoglottis elmeri is listed in Appendix II of CITES. There are no quotas or suspensions in place for the species.
