= Chinese Monument Ground =

Chinese WWII memorial in Myitkyina, Myanmar

Coordinates: 25°27′59.5″N 97°25′07.0″E

The Chinese Monument Ground（Chinese: 中國遠徵軍陣亡將士紀念設施; lit. 'Memorial facility of the fallen officers and soldiers of Chinese Expeditionary Force'), is a memorial that commemorates the fallen officers and soldiers of the Chinese Expeditionary Force. The memorial consists of two main structures, the Chinese Expeditionary Force Monument (Chinese: 中國遠徵軍紀念碑) and the underground chamber(Chinese: 地宮).

== Background ==
The completion and opening ceremony was held on June 10, 2023.

It is located in the suburbs of Myitkyina, Myanmar, about 10 kilometers from Myitkyina. Beneath the monument is an underground chamber which covers an area of about 277 square meters, where the remains of 347 fallen soldiers of the Chinese Expeditionary Force are buried; the monument is about 17 meters high and covers an area of 184 square meters.

== See also ==
- Second War Allied Forces Memorial Monument
