= Spathoglottis palawanensis =

Conservation status
- CITES Appendix II

Scientific classification
- Kingdom: Plantae
- Clade: Embryophytes
- Clade: Tracheophytes
- Clade: Spermatophytes
- Clade: Angiosperms
- Clade: Monocots
- Order: Asparagales
- Family: Orchidaceae
- Subfamily: Epidendroideae
- Genus: Spathoglottis
- Species: S. palawanensis

Binomial name
- Spathoglottis palawanensis Lubag-Arquiza

Species of orchid

Spathoglottis palawanensis is a species of flowering plant in the family Orchidaceae. It is a pseudobulbous plant native to the Philippines. The species was described in 2006, and is listed in Appendix II of CITES.

== Taxonomy ==
The species was described by Amihan Mercado Lubag-Arquiza in 2006. The description was published in Orchid Digest. The holotype was collected from Puerto Princesa in 2001.

== Distribution ==
Spathoglottis palawanensis is native to the wet tropical biome of Palawan, in the Philippines.

== Description ==
Spathoglottis palawanensis has underground pseudobulbs.

== Conservation ==
Spathoglottis palawanensis is listed in Appendix II of CITES. Export from the Philippines is restricted.
