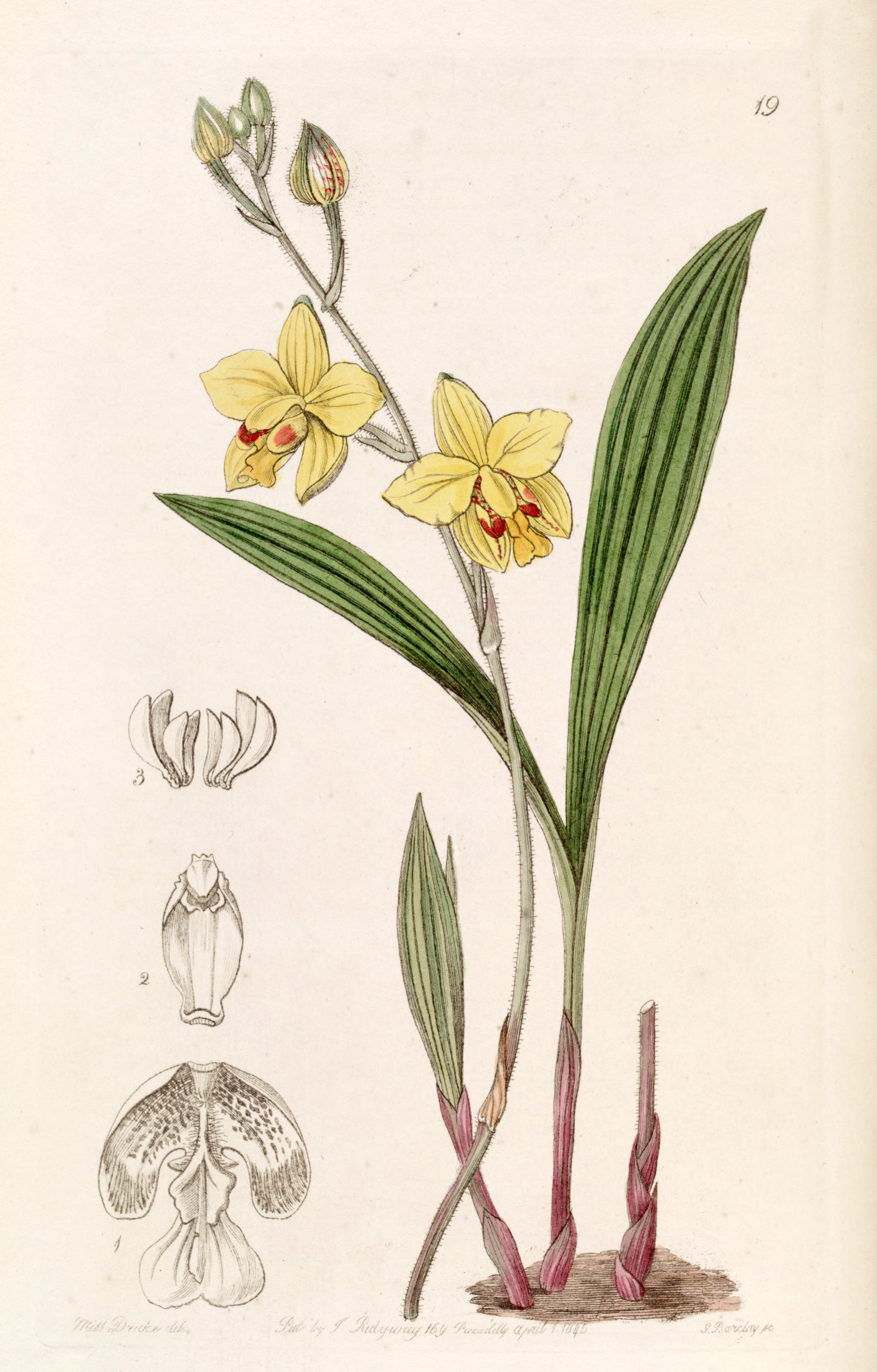
- Illustration of Spathoglottis pubescens

Scientific classification
- Kingdom: Plantae
- Clade: Tracheophytes
- Clade: Angiosperms
- Clade: Monocots
- Order: Asparagales
- Family: Orchidaceae
- Subfamily: Epidendroideae
- Genus: Spathoglottis
- Species: S. pubescens

Binomial name
- Spathoglottis pubescens Lindl.

Synonyms
- Epipactis graminifolia Roxb.; Pogonia graminifolia (Roxb.) Voigt; Spathoglottis fortunei Lindl.; Spathoglottis parvifolia Lindl.; Spathoglottis khasyana Griff.; Spathoglottis bensonii Hook.f.; Spathoglottis pubescens var. berkleyi Hook.f.; Spathoglottis pubescens var. parvifolia (Lindl.) Hook.f.; Spathoglottis plicata var. pubescens (Lindl.) M.Hiroe

= Spathoglottis pubescens =

Species of orchid

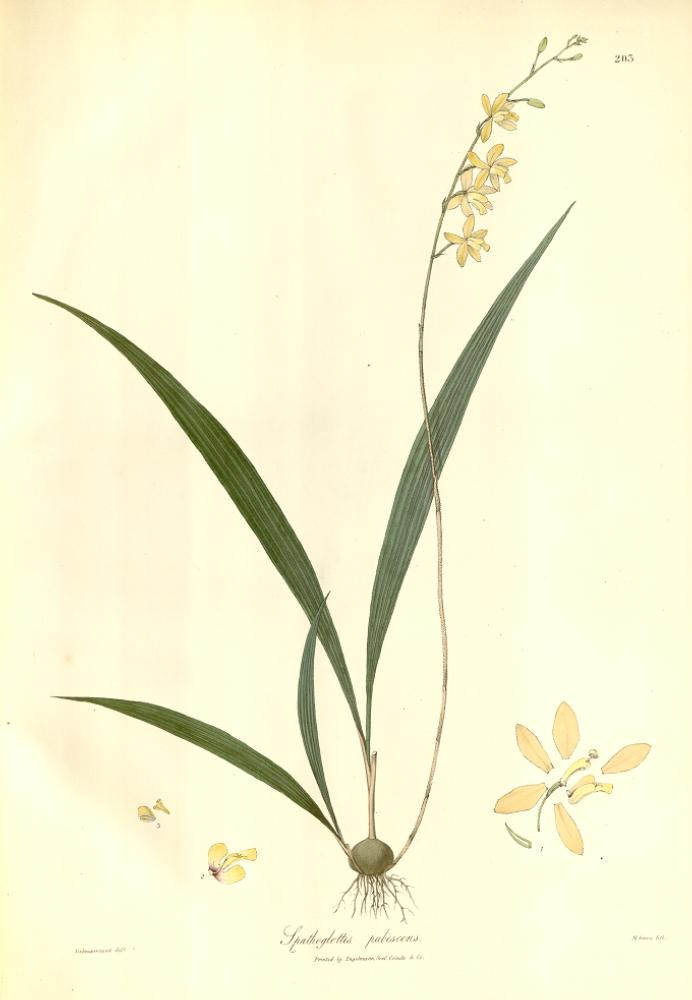
Spathoglottis pubescens

Spathoglottis pubescens is a species of terrestrial orchid found from Arunachal Pradesh in India to southern China and Indochina.

Bright golden yellow flowers, 1.5 cm in diameter, with base and side-lobes of the lip with dark red markings.
