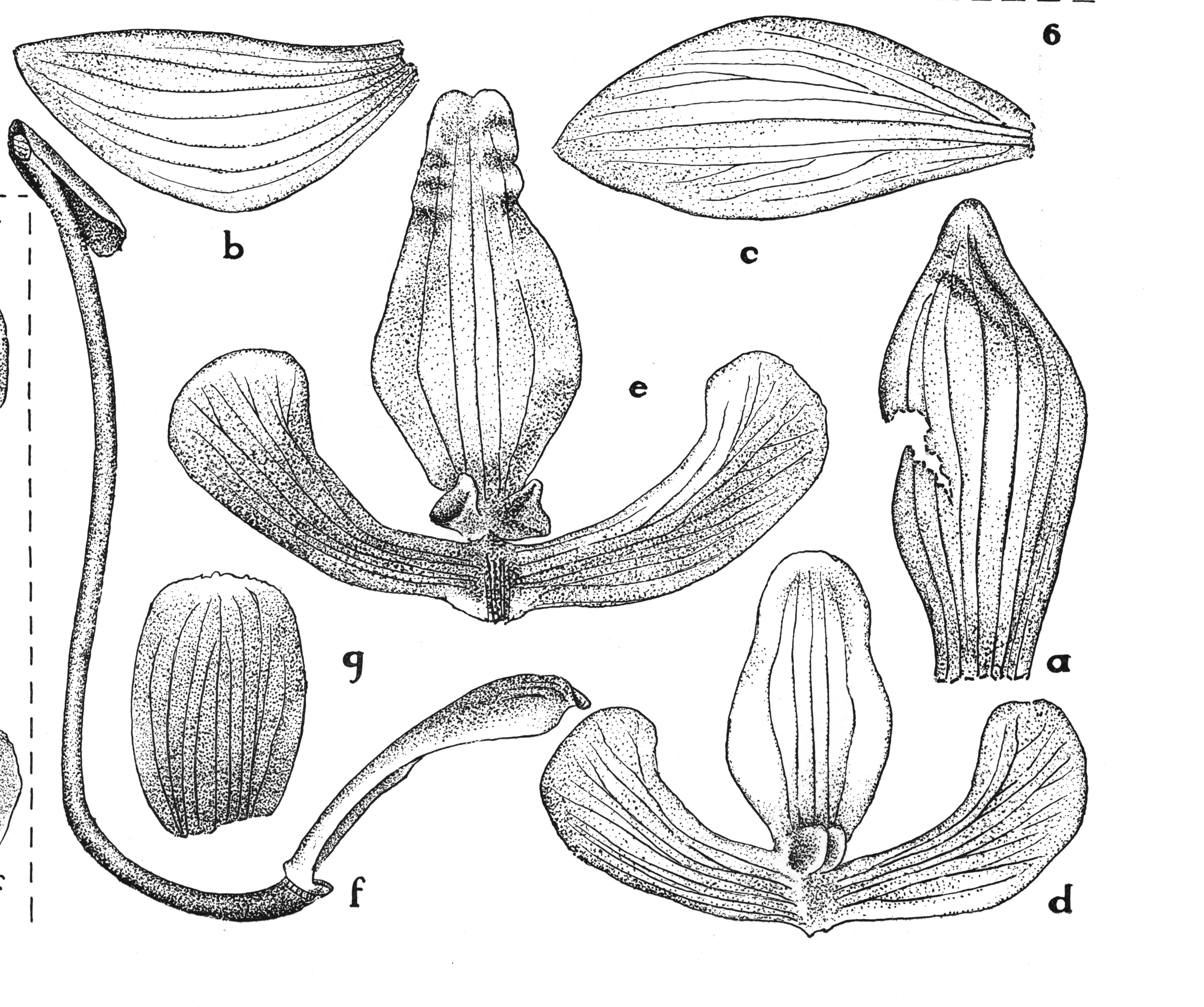
- Illustration showing the petals of Spathoglottis doctersii

Conservation status
- CITES Appendix II

Scientific classification
- Kingdom: Plantae
- Clade: Tracheophytes
- Clade: Angiosperms
- Clade: Monocots
- Order: Asparagales
- Family: Orchidaceae
- Subfamily: Epidendroideae
- Genus: Spathoglottis
- Species: S. doctersii

Binomial name
- Spathoglottis doctersii J.J.Sm.

Synonyms
- Spathoglottis doctersii var. emarginata J.J.Sm.

= Spathoglottis doctersii =

Species of flowering plant

Spathoglottis doctersii is a species of flowering plant in the family Orchidaceae.

The species is native to the wet tropical biome of New Guinea.

== Taxonomy ==
Johannes Jacobus Smith named the species in 1935.

== Description ==
Spathoglottis doctersii has underground storage organs (pseudobulbs).

== Conservation ==
Spathoglottis doctersii is listed in Appendix II of CITES. There are no suspensions or quotas in place for the species.
