= Radhapuram =

Radhapuram may refer to:

- Radhapuram taluk, subdivision in Tamil Nadu, India
  - Radhapuram (state assembly constituency)

== See also ==
- Radhapur (disambiguation)
