= Spathoglottis albida =

Conservation status
- CITES Appendix II

Scientific classification
- Kingdom: Plantae
- Clade: Tracheophytes
- Clade: Angiosperms
- Clade: Monocots
- Order: Asparagales
- Family: Orchidaceae
- Subfamily: Epidendroideae
- Genus: Spathoglottis
- Species: S. albida

Binomial name
- Spathoglottis albida Kraenzl.

Species of flowering plant

Spathoglottis albida is a species of flowering plant in the family Orchidaceae. It is native to the Bismarck Archipelago, and was described in 1898. The species is listed in Appendix II of CITES.

== Taxonomy ==
The species was described by Friedrich Wilhelm Ludwig Kraenzlin in 1898.

== Distribution ==
Spathoglottis albida is native to the wet tropical biome of the Bismarck Archipelago.

== Description ==
Spathoglottis albida has underground pseudobulbs.

== Conservation ==
Spathoglottis albida is listed in Appendix II of CITES. There are no quotas in place for the species.There are suspensions on its export from Papua New Guinea.
