= Spathoglottis pacifica =

Conservation status
- CITES Appendix II

Scientific classification
- Kingdom: Plantae
- Clade: Tracheophytes
- Clade: Angiosperms
- Clade: Monocots
- Order: Asparagales
- Family: Orchidaceae
- Subfamily: Epidendroideae
- Genus: Spathoglottis
- Species: S. pacifica

Binomial name
- Spathoglottis pacifica Rchb.f.

Species of flowering plant

Spathoglottis pacifica is a species of flowering plant in the family Orchidaceae. It is native to the southwestern Pacific. The species was described in 1868, and is listed in Appendix II of CITES.

== Taxonomy ==
The species was described by Heinrich Gustav Reichenbach in 1868.

== Distribution ==
Spathoglottis pacifica is native to Fiji, the Solomon Islands, Tonga, Vanuatu, and Wallis and Futuna. It has been introduced to the Cook Islands.

== Description ==
Spathoglottis pacifica has underground pseudobulbs.

== Conservation ==
Spathoglottis pacifica is listed in Appendix II of CITES. There are no quotas or suspensions in place for the species.
