= Spathoglottis latifolia =

Conservation status
- CITES Appendix II

Scientific classification
- Kingdom: Plantae
- Clade: Tracheophytes
- Clade: Angiosperms
- Clade: Monocots
- Order: Asparagales
- Family: Orchidaceae
- Subfamily: Epidendroideae
- Genus: Spathoglottis
- Species: S. latifolia

Binomial name
- Spathoglottis latifolia (Gaudich.) Garay & Ormerod

Synonyms
- Bletia latifolia Gaudich.; Spathoglottis patentibractea J.J.Sm.

Species of flowering plant

Spathoglottis latifolia is a species of flowering plant in the family Orchidaceae. It is native to New Guinea, and was described in 1829.

== Taxonomy ==
The species was described by Charles Gaudichaud-Beaupré in 1829, and placed in the genus Bletia. In 2001, Leslie Andrew Garay and Paul Abel Ormerod moved it to the genus Spathoglottis.

== Distribution ==
Spathoglottis latifolia is native to the wet tropical biome of western New Guinea.

== Description ==
Spathoglottis latifolia has underground pseudobulbs.

== Conservation ==
Spathoglottis latifolia is listed in Appendix II of CITES. There are no quotas or suspensions in place for the species.
