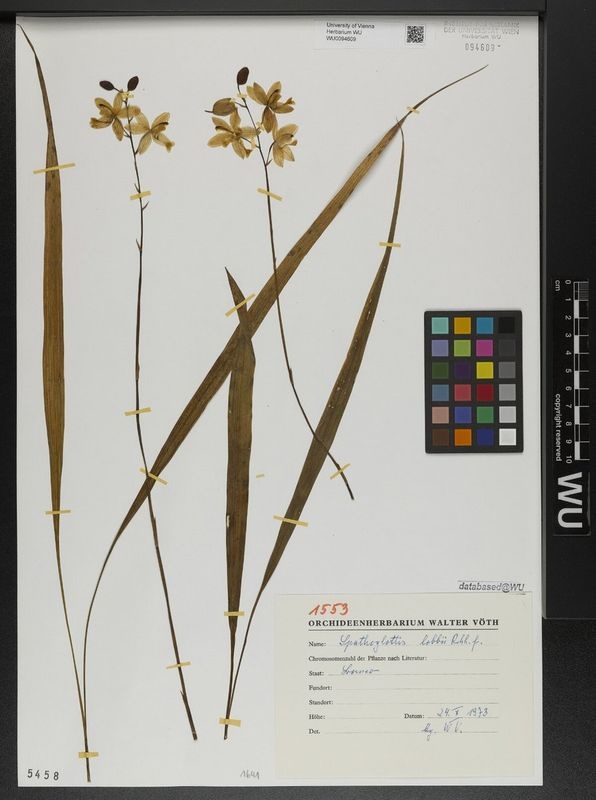

Scientific classification
- Kingdom: Plantae
- Clade: Embryophytes
- Clade: Tracheophytes
- Clade: Spermatophytes
- Clade: Angiosperms
- Clade: Monocots
- Order: Asparagales
- Family: Orchidaceae
- Subfamily: Epidendroideae
- Genus: Spathoglottis
- Species: S. lobbii

Binomial name
- Spathoglottis lobbii Rchb.f.

= Spathoglottis lobbii =

Species of flowering plant

Spathoglottis lobbii is a species of flowering plant in the family Orchidaceae. It is a pseudobulbous plant native to Southeast Asia. The species was described in 1862.

== Taxonomy ==
The species was described by Heinrich Gustav Reichenbach in 1862.

== Distribution ==
Spathoglottis lobbii is native to the wet tropical biome of Malaya, Myanmar, Thailand, and Vietnam.

== Description ==
Spathoglottis lobbii is a geophyte or epiphyte. It has pseudobulbs.
