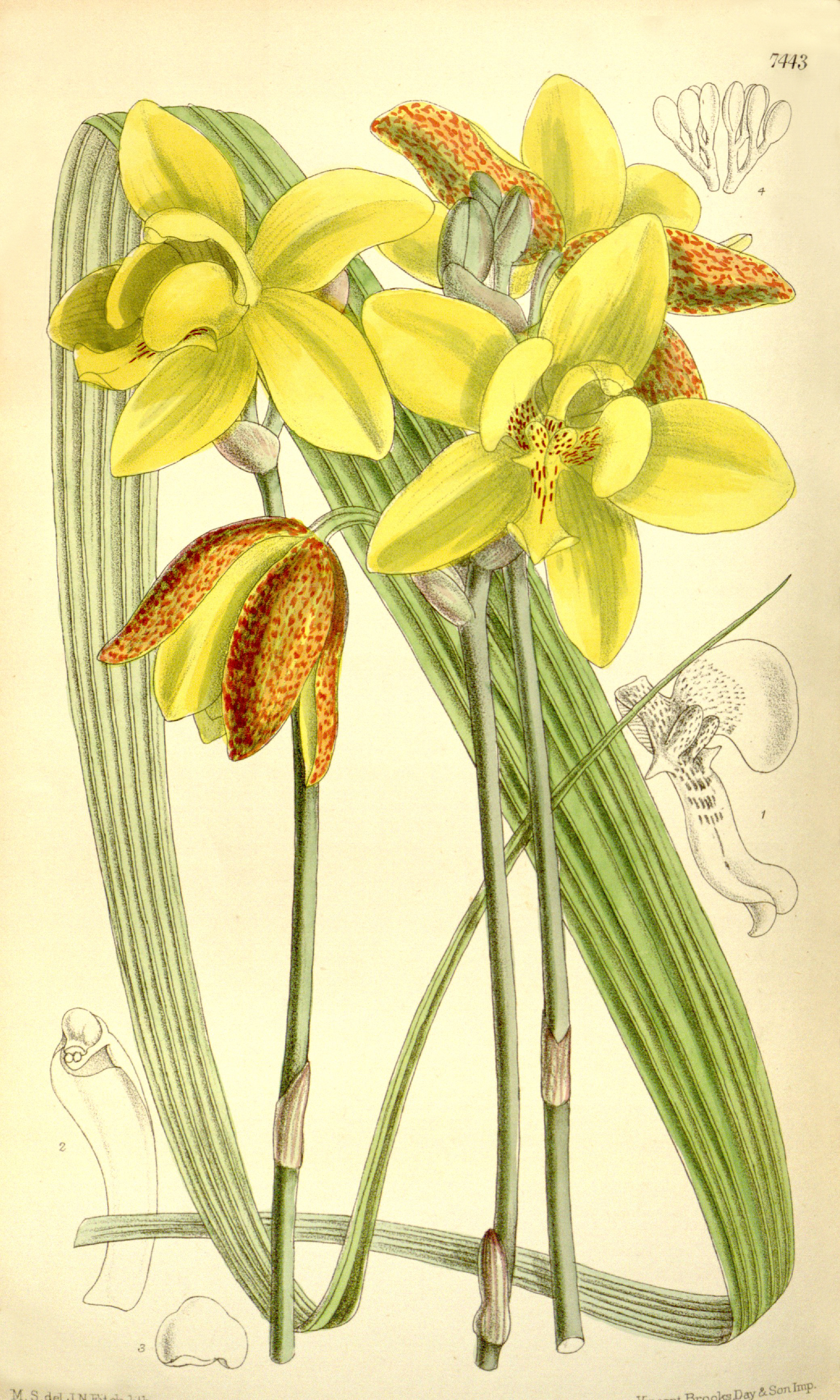
- Illustration of Spathoglottis kimballiana

Scientific classification
- Kingdom: Plantae
- Clade: Tracheophytes
- Clade: Angiosperms
- Clade: Monocots
- Order: Asparagales
- Family: Orchidaceae
- Subfamily: Epidendroideae
- Genus: Spathoglottis
- Species: S. kimballiana

Binomial name
- Spathoglottis kimballiana Hook.f.

= Spathoglottis kimballiana =

Species of orchid

Spathoglottis kimballiana is a species of orchid found from Borneo to the Philippines.
