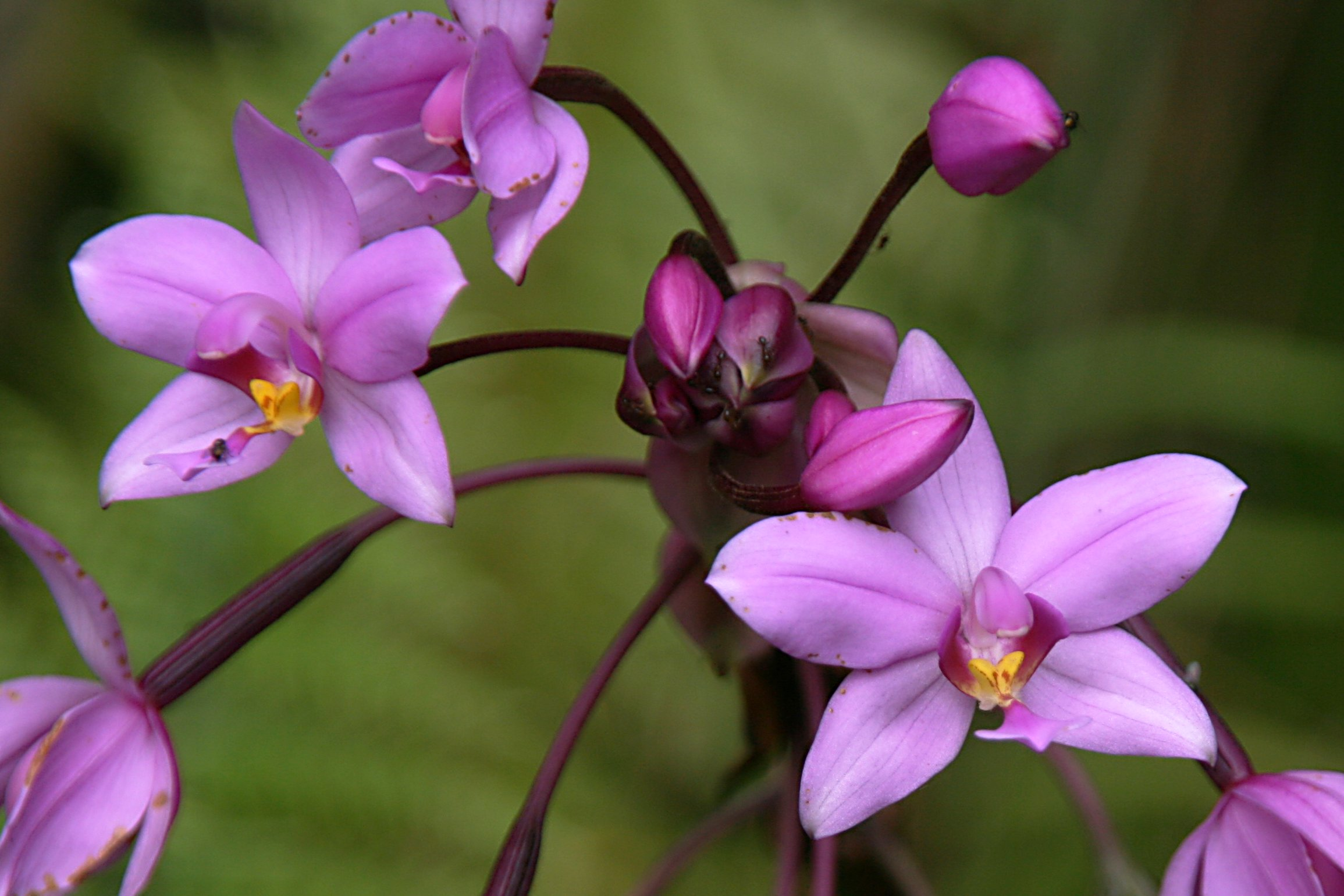
- Flowers
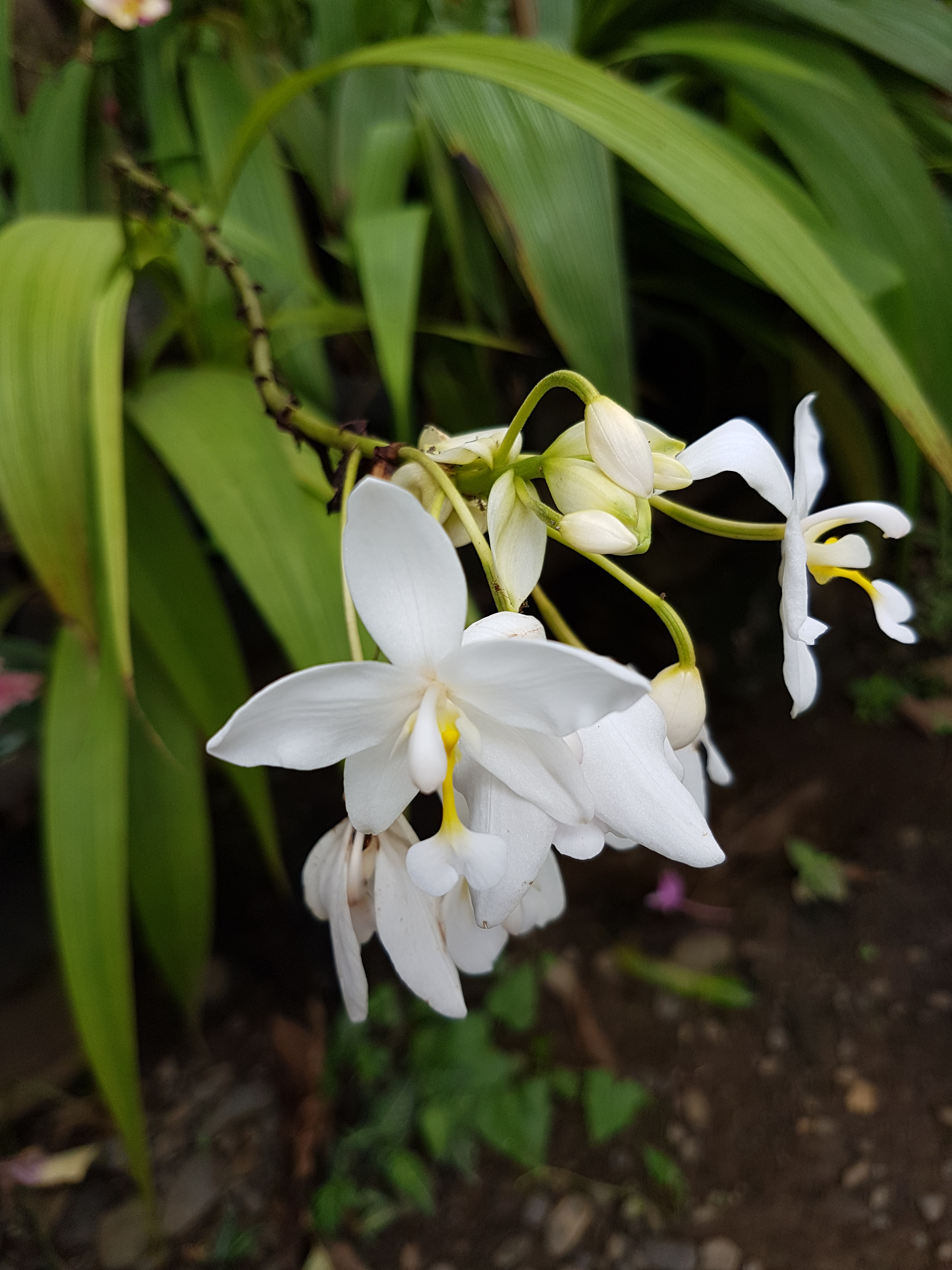
- White cultivar

Scientific classification
- Kingdom: Plantae
- Clade: Tracheophytes
- Clade: Angiosperms
- Clade: Monocots
- Order: Asparagales
- Family: Orchidaceae
- Subfamily: Epidendroideae
- Genus: Spathoglottis
- Species: S. plicata

Binomial name
- Spathoglottis plicata Blume

Synonyms
- Bletia angustifolia Gaudich.; Paxtonia rosea Lindl.; Spathoglottis lilacina Griff.; Phaius rumphii Blume; Spathoglottis spicata Lindl.; Spathoglottis deplanchei Rchb.f.; Spathoglottis vieillardii Rchb.f.; Spathoglottis angustifolia (Gaudich.) Benth. & Hook.f.; Spathoglottis augustorum Rchb.f.; Spathoglottis rosea (Lindl.) G.Nicholson; Spathoglottis plicata var. minahassae Schltr.; Spathoglottis daenikeri Kraenzl.; Calanthe poilanei Gagnep.

= Spathoglottis plicata =

Large purple orchid

Species of plant

Spathoglottis plicata, commonly known as the Philippine ground orchid, or large purple orchid is an evergreen, terrestrial plant with crowded pseudobulbs, three or four large, pleated leaves and up to forty resupinate, pink to purple flowers. It is found from tropical and subtropical Asia to Australia and the western Pacific including Tonga and Samoa.

== Description ==
Spathoglottis plicata is an evergreen, terrestrial herb that forms tall clumps. It has crowded pseudobulbs 40–60 mm (1.6–2.4 in) long and 20–40 mm (0.8–2 in) wide, each with three or four pleated leaves 50–90 mm (2–4 in) long and 8–15 mm (0.3–0.6 in) wide on a stalk 80–150 mm (3–6 in) long. Up to forty deep pink to purple resupinate flowers 35–55 mm (1–2 in) long and wide are borne on a hairy flowering stem 50–100 cm (20–40 in) tall. The dorsal sepal is 20–30 mm (0.8–1 in) long and the lateral sepals are slightly narrower. The petals are about the same length as the sepals but significantly wider. The labellum is T-shaped, a similar size to the dorsal sepal and has three lobes with the side lobes close to vertical. At the tip of the column there is a cap, under which masses of yellow pollen grains can be seen.

Flowering occurs from September to April in Australia and in most months in China and New Guinea. The fruit is a capsule about 3 mm (0.1 in) long, green and cylindrical. After the flower is fertilized, the seeds take about six weeks to develop. When ripe, the capsule splits open and thousands of tiny seeds are carried away by wind.

== Taxonomy and naming ==
Spathoglottis plicata was first formally described in 1825 by Carl Ludwig Blume who published the description in Bijdragen tot de flora van Nederlandsch Indië. The specific epithet (plicata) is a Latin word meaning "folded".

== Distribution and habitat ==
The large purple orchid is found in Taiwan, southern India, Indonesia, Japan, Malaysia, New Guinea, the Philippines, Sri Lanka, Thailand, Vietnam, Myanmar, Australia, Tonga and Samoa. In Australia it occurs from Cooktown to the Jardine River on Cape York Peninsula. It grows in seasonally inundated and other moist areas, in sunny areas near swamps, seepages, and small streams. In Australia it flowers from September to April.

== Conservation ==
Spathoglottis plicata was previously listed as "vulnerable" under the Environment Protection and Biodiversity Conservation Act 1999 but was delisted in 2010.

== Use in horticulture ==
Spathoglottis plicata and its varieties have been cultivated and selected. The typical one has a bright purple flower. Some of them have mauve or pale mauve flowers. The rare pure white form is called ‘Penang White’. Due to its hardiness and fast growth, Spathoglottis plicata is cultivated and used in hybridizing with other mountain Spathoglottis that are difficult to grow in the lowland to produce more interesting varieties. The first Spathoglottis hybrid was produced in 1932 by Richard Eric Holttum who crossed S. plicata with S. aurea and gave it the name Spathoglottis 'Primrose'. ‘Dwarf Legion’ is a hybrid of 'Primrose' and S. tomentosa, a dwarf form that produces many colours of flower, from pink to yellow, and pure cream. Spathoglottis plicata needs to be grown in well-drained, well-aerated soil with the upper part of the ‘bulb’ above the ground level. Dilute manure water applied frequently is recommended.

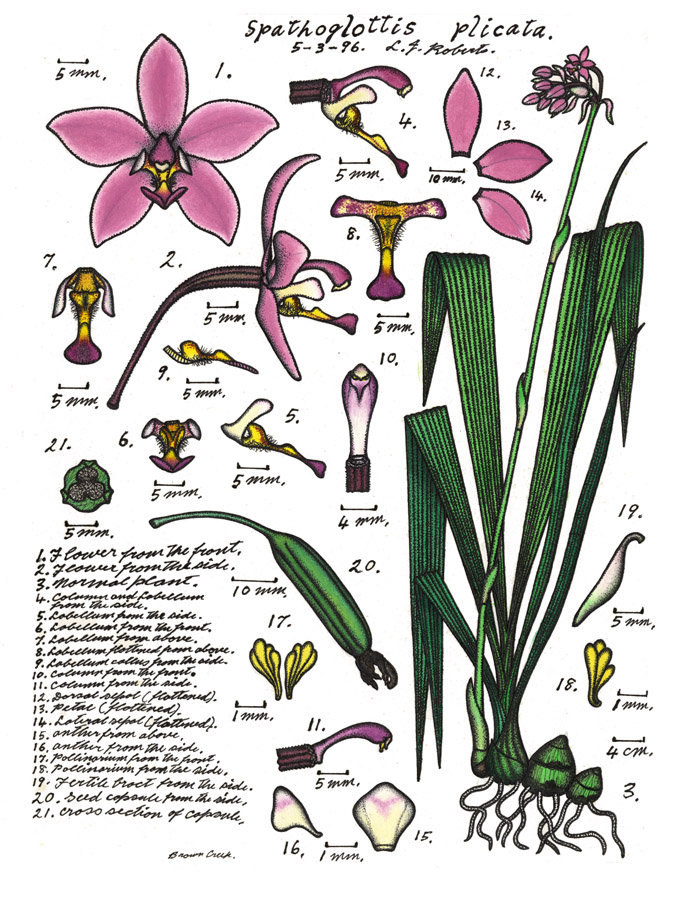
Illustration by Lewis Roberts

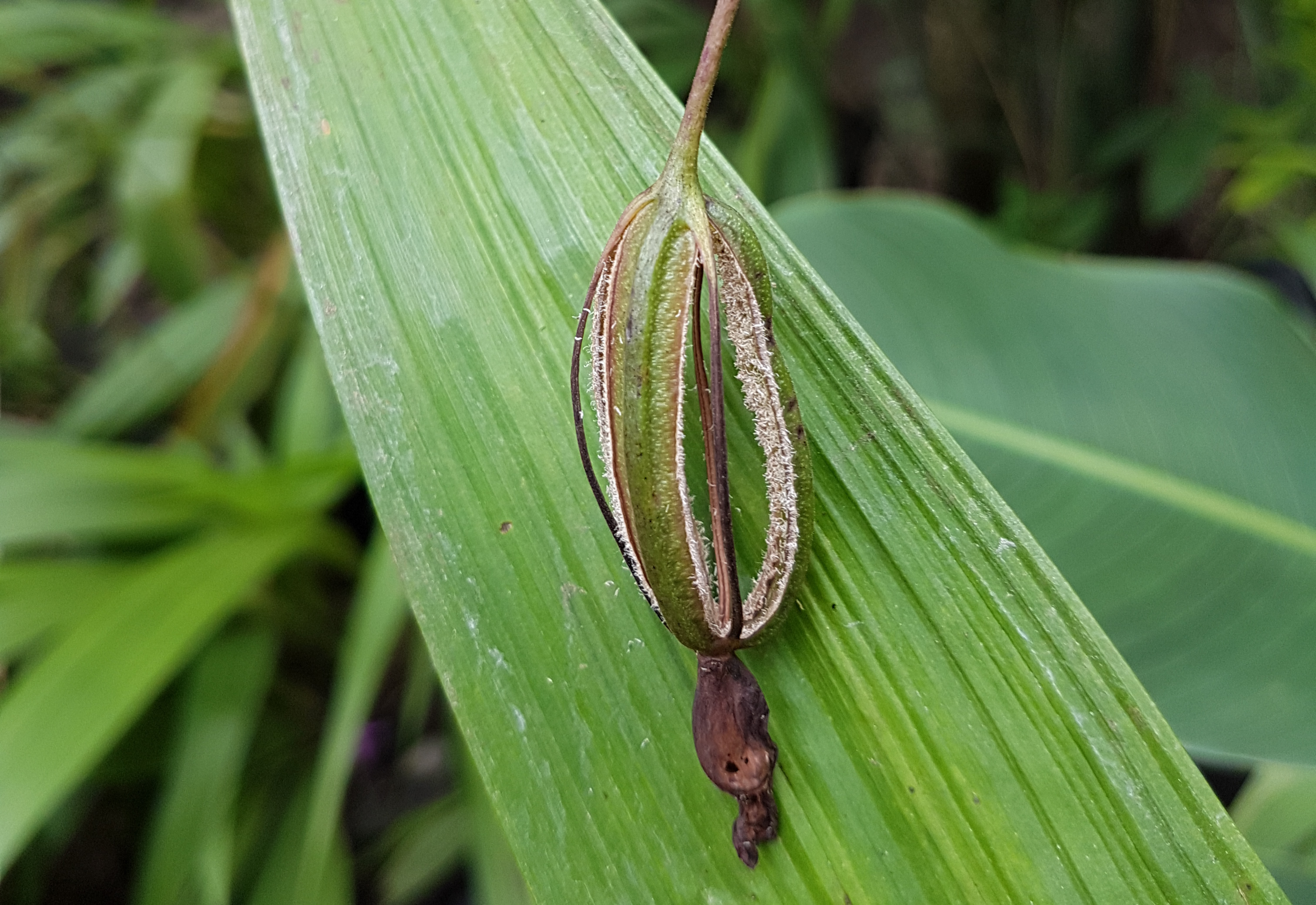
Capsule displaying dehiscence

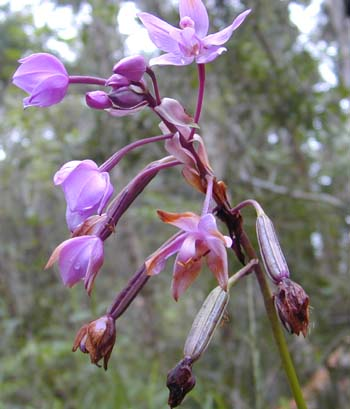
Flowers and fruits at various stages of development

Flower detail

== Tissue culture ==
Micropropagation of Spathoglottis plicata Blume. and artificial seed production by alginate-encapsulation of PLBs was reported in 2017.
