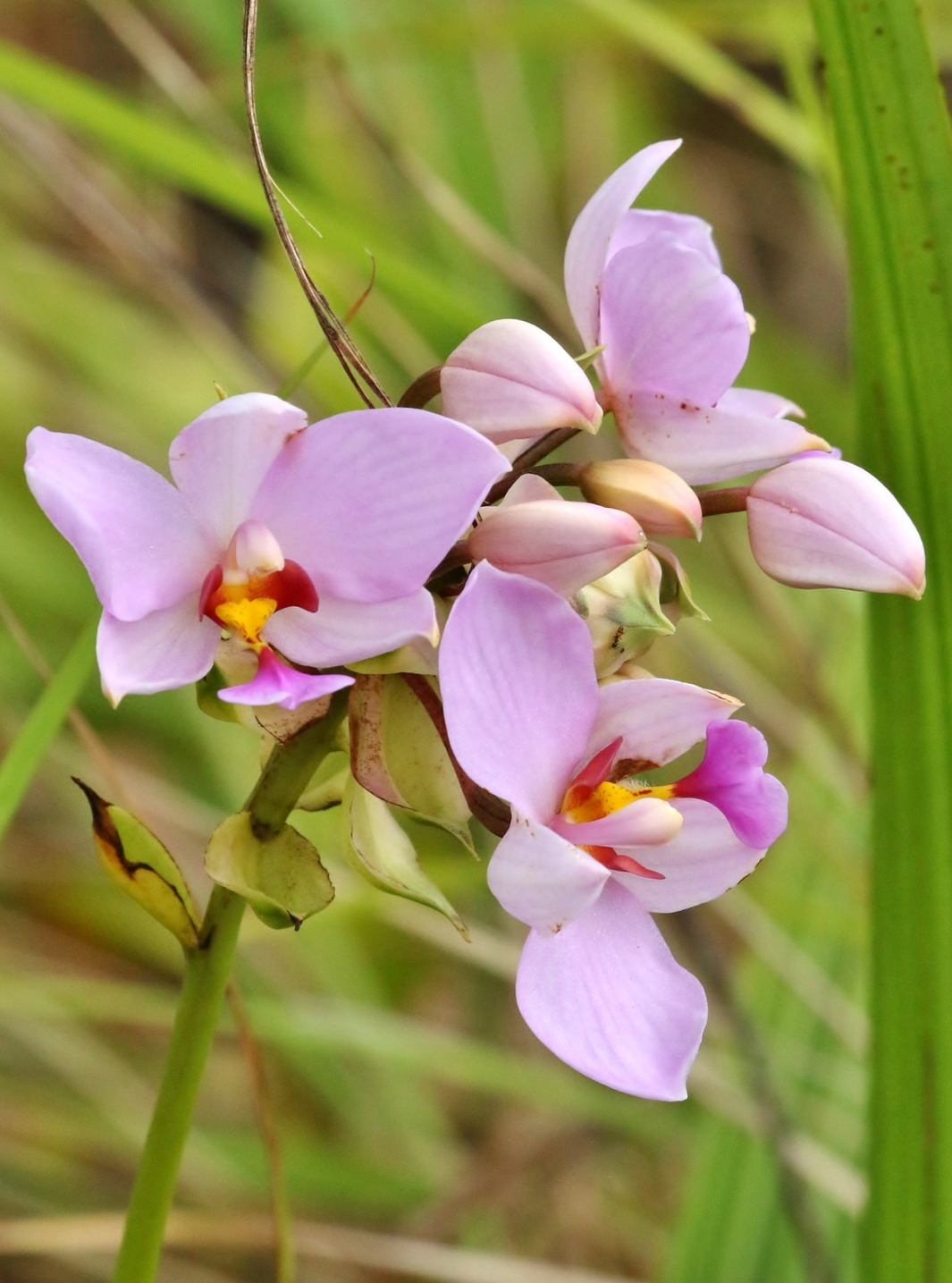

Conservation status
- CITES Appendix II

Scientific classification
- Kingdom: Plantae
- Clade: Embryophytes
- Clade: Tracheophytes
- Clade: Spermatophytes
- Clade: Angiosperms
- Clade: Monocots
- Order: Asparagales
- Family: Orchidaceae
- Subfamily: Epidendroideae
- Genus: Spathoglottis
- Species: S. carolinensis

Binomial name
- Spathoglottis carolinensis Schltr.

= Spathoglottis carolinensis =

Species of flowering plant

Spathoglottis carolinensis, commonly known as the Caroline ground orchid, is a species of flowering plant in the family Orchidaceae.

The species is native to the wet tropical biome of the Caroline Islands and the Mariana Islands, in the northwest Pacific ocean. It was described by Rudolf Schlechter in 1914.

== Description ==
Spathoglottis carolinensis is a perennial herb. The plants have underground storage organs.

== Conservation ==
Spathoglottis carolinensis is listed in Appendix II of CITES. There are no quotas or suspensions in place for the species.
