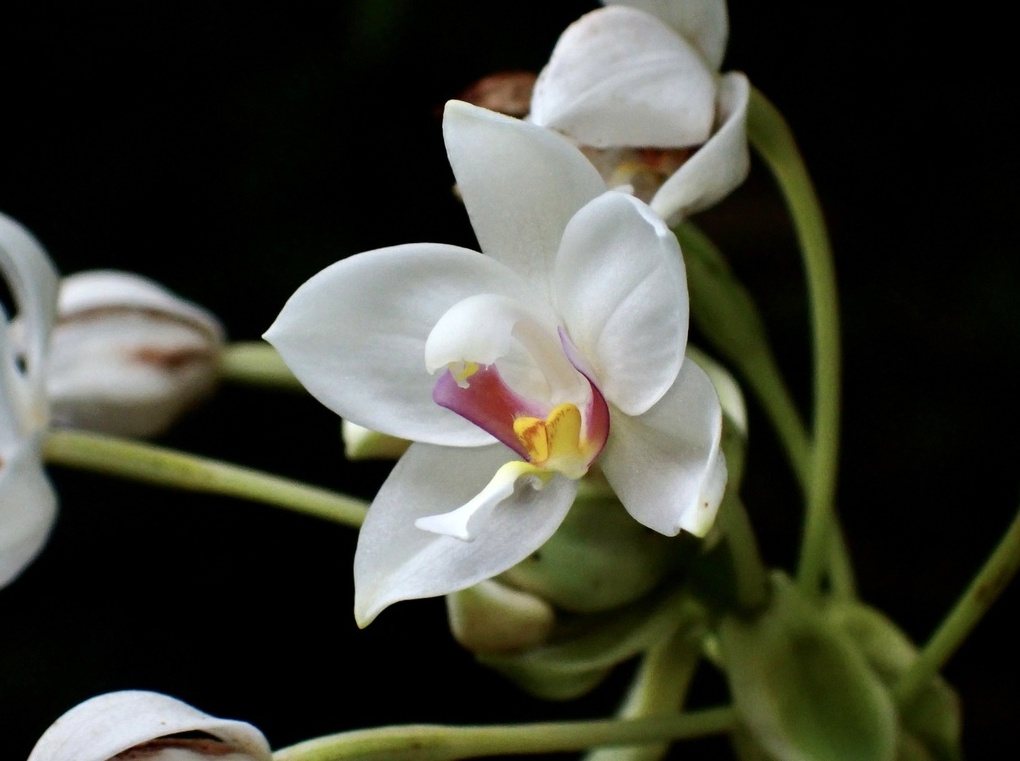

Conservation status
- CITES Appendix II

Scientific classification
- Kingdom: Plantae
- Clade: Embryophytes
- Clade: Tracheophytes
- Clade: Spermatophytes
- Clade: Angiosperms
- Clade: Monocots
- Order: Asparagales
- Family: Orchidaceae
- Subfamily: Epidendroideae
- Genus: Spathoglottis
- Species: S. sulawesiensis

Binomial name
- Spathoglottis sulawesiensis T.Green

= Spathoglottis sulawesiensis =

Species of flowering plant

Spathoglottis sulawesiensis is a species of flowering plant in the family Orchidaceae. It is native to Indonesia. The species was described in 2003, and is listed in Appendix II of CITES.

== Taxonomy ==
The species was described by Ted Green in 2003. The description was published in Orchid Digest. The holotype was collected on a road leading to Bada Valley, at an elevation of 1,500 feet (460 m).

== Distribution ==
The species is native to the wet tropical biome of Sulawesi, Indonesia.

== Description ==
The species has underground pseudobulbs.

== Taxonomy ==
Spathoglottis sulawesiensis is listed in Appendix II of CITES. There are no quotas or suspensions in place for the species.
