= Chārpāte =

- Location in Burma
- Coordinates: 25°26′N 97°23′E
- Country: Burma
- State: Kachin State
- District: Myitkyina District
- Township: Myitkyina Township

Population (2005)
  - Religions: Buddhism
- Time zone: UTC+6.30 (UTC + 6:30)

Chārpāte is a village in Myitkyina Township in Myitkyina District in the Kachin State of north-eastern Burma. It is located 3.1 miles from the city of Myitkyina.

== History ==
Chārpāte was the scene of fighting between Japanese forces and Allied forces composed of Merrill's Marauders and Chinese troops during the Siege of Myitkyina in the Second World War.
