= Spathoglottis aurea =

Conservation status
- CITES Appendix II

Scientific classification
- Kingdom: Plantae
- Clade: Tracheophytes
- Clade: Angiosperms
- Clade: Monocots
- Order: Asparagales
- Family: Orchidaceae
- Subfamily: Epidendroideae
- Genus: Spathoglottis
- Species: S. aurea

Binomial name
- Spathoglottis aurea Lindl.

Synonyms
- Spathoglottis wrayi Hook.f.

Species of flowering plant

Spathoglottis aurea is a species of flowering plant in the family Orchidaceae. It is an epiphyte with yellow flowers, and is native to south-east Asia. The species was described in 1850, and is listed in Appendix II of CITES.

== Taxonomy ==
The species was described by John Lindley in 1850.

== Distribution ==
Spathoglottis aurea is native to the wet tropical biome of Borneo, Java, the Lesser Sunda Islands, Malaya, New Guinea, Sulawesi, Sumatra, Thailand, and Vietnam. It grows at elevations of around 1,490 metres (4,890 ft).

== Description ==
Spathoglottis aurea is an epiphyte with ovoid pseudobulbs. It grows 60–90 centimetres (2.0–3.0 ft) tall.

The leaves are lanceolate, 30–50 centimetres (12–20 in) long, 2.5–4 centimetres (0.98–1.57 in) wide, and have 10–20 centimetres (3.9–7.9 in) long stems.

The inflorescences are lax, and have around ten flowers. The flowers are yellow, and 4–6.5 centimetres (1.6–2.6 in) wide. The labellum has red markings. The sepals are oblong, 2–2.5 centimetres (0.79–0.98 in) long, and 1–2 centimetres (0.39–0.79 in) wide. The petals are elliptical, 2–2.5 centimetres (0.79–0.98 in) long, and 1–1.4 centimetres (0.39–0.55 in) wide. The labellum has three lobes, and is around 2.2 centimetres (0.87 in) long and 3.2 centimetres (1.3 in) wide. The column is curved, and 1.5–1.8 centimetres (0.59–0.71 in) long. The plant flowers in May.

== Conservation ==
Spathoglottis aurea is listed in Appendix II of CITES. There are no quotas or suspensions in place for the species.
