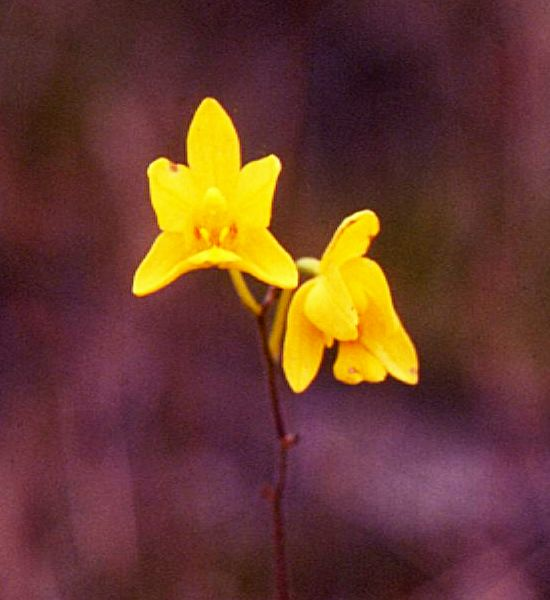
- Spathoglottis affinis flower

Scientific classification
- Kingdom: Plantae
- Clade: Embryophytes
- Clade: Tracheophytes
- Clade: Spermatophytes
- Clade: Angiosperms
- Clade: Monocots
- Order: Asparagales
- Family: Orchidaceae
- Subfamily: Epidendroideae
- Genus: Spathoglottis
- Species: S. affinis

Binomial name
- Spathoglottis affinis de Vriese

Synonyms
- Spathoglottis regneri Rchb.f.

= Spathoglottis affinis =

Species of orchid

Spathoglottis affinis is a species of orchid found from Indochina to western Malesia. It is a pseudobulbous plant with yellow flowers, and capsule fruits. The species was described in 1855.

== Taxonomy ==
Spathoglottis affinis was described by Willem Hendrik de Vriese in 1855.

== Distribution ==
Spathoglottis affinis is native to the wet tropical biome of India (Assam, Bangladesh, Borneo, Cambodia, Java, Laos, Malaya, Myanmar, Thailand, and Vietnam.

The species grows in grassy areas, in evergreen or deciduous forests, at elevations of 100–1,200 metres (330–3,940 ft).

== Description ==
Spathoglottis affinis is a geophyte or epiphyte. It has pseudobulbs, which are somewhat flattened. The flowering shoots are 30–60 centimetres (12–24 in) tall. The plant has two to four linear-lanceolate leaves, which are 18–42 centimetres (7.1–16.5 in) long, and 1–2.3 centimetres (0.39–0.91 in) wide.

The flower stems are 3–5 centimetres (1.2–2.0 in) long. The inflorescences are purple, loose, and covered in short soft hairs. The inflorescence stems are 23–50 centimetres (9.1–19.7 in) long. The flowers are yellow, and the sepals cometimes have red streaks. The sepals are elliptical, obtuse, or subacute, covered in short soft hairs, 16–21 millimetres (0.63–0.83 in) long, and 6.5–10 millimetres (0.26–0.39 in) wide. The petals are elliptical, obtuse, 15.5–20 millimetres (0.61–0.79 in) long, and 7–11 millimetres (0.28–0.43 in) wide. The labellum has three lobes. The column is yellow and slender.

The fruit is an ellipsoid capsule, measuring 8–30 millimetres (0.31–1.18 in) long, and 6–8 millimetres (0.24–0.31 in) wide.
