= Spathoglottis ixioides =

Conservation status
- CITES Appendix II

Scientific classification
- Kingdom: Plantae
- Clade: Tracheophytes
- Clade: Angiosperms
- Clade: Monocots
- Order: Asparagales
- Family: Orchidaceae
- Subfamily: Epidendroideae
- Genus: Spathoglottis
- Species: S. ixioides

Binomial name
- Spathoglottis ixioides (D.Don) Lindl.

Synonyms
- Cymbidium ixioides D.Don

Species of flowering plant

Spathoglottis ixioides is a species of flowering plant in the family Orchidaceae. It has pseudobulbs and yellow flowers. The species is native to India, Nepal, the Himalayas, and Tibet.

Spathoglottis ixioides was described in 1825, and is listed in Appendix II of CITES.

== Taxonomy ==
Spathoglottis ixioides was described by David Don in 1825, and placed in the genus Cymbidium. In 1831, John Lindley moved it to the genus Spathoglottis.

== Distribution ==
Spathoglottis ixioides is native to the temperate biome of India (Assam), Nepal, the eastern Himalayas, and Tibet. It grows on rocky slopes, at elevations of 2,300–2,800 metres (7,500–9,200 ft).

== Description ==
Spathoglottis ixioides has subglobose, underground pseudobulbs. The leaves are linear-lanceolate, 6–12 centimetres (2.4–4.7 in) long, and 0.3–1.1 centimetres (0.12–0.43 in) wide. The leaf stalk is 1–2 centimetres (0.39–0.79 in) long.

The inflorescence is 8–13 centimetres (3.1–5.1 in) long, slender, and has one or two yellow flowers. The dorsal sepal is elliptical, 18–22 millimetres (0.71–0.87 in) long, 8–10 millimetres (0.31–0.39 in) wide, and has five or six veins. The lateral sepals are ovate-lanceolate to oblong-lanceolate, 15–20 millimetres (0.59–0.79 in) long, and 5–9 millimetres (0.20–0.35 in) wide. The petals have seven veins. The lip is 14–18 millimetres (0.55–0.71 in) long, and has three lobes. The column is 1–1.7 centimetres (0.39–0.67 in) long. The plant flowers from August to September.

== Conservation ==
Spathoglottis ixioides is listed in Appendix II of CITES. There are restrictions on its export from India.

== Nomenclature ==
In Chinese, the species is known as 少花苞舌兰 (shao hua bao she lan).
