= Spathoglottis hardingiana =

Conservation status
- CITES Appendix II

Scientific classification
- Kingdom: Plantae
- Clade: Tracheophytes
- Clade: Angiosperms
- Clade: Monocots
- Order: Asparagales
- Family: Orchidaceae
- Subfamily: Epidendroideae
- Genus: Spathoglottis
- Species: S. hardingiana

Binomial name
- Spathoglottis hardingiana C.S.P.Parish & Rchb.f.

Species of flowering plant

Spathoglottis hardingiana (originally published as Spathoglottis handingiana) is a species of flowering plant in the family Orchidaceae. It is an epiphyte with pink flowers. The species is native to south-east Asia.

Spathoglottis hardingiana was described in 1878, and is listed in Appendix II of CITES.

== Taxonomy ==
Spathoglottis hardingiana was first published as Spathoglottis handingiana in 1878, by Charles Parish and Heinrich Gustav Reichenbach.

== Distribution ==
Spathoglottis hardingiana is native to the wet tropical biome of Bangladesh, Malaysia, Myanmar, and Thailand. It grows in limestone forests, at elevations of 50–300 metres (160–980 ft).

== Description ==
Spathoglottis hardingiana is an epiphyte. The flowering shoots are 16–33 centimetres (6.3–13.0 in) tall. The pseudobulbs are ovoid to conical, up to 1.7 centimetres (0.67 in) long, and up to 1 centimetre (0.39 in) wide.

The plant has two or three grass-like, linear-lanceolate leaves, which are 14–27 centimetres (5.5–10.6 in) long, and 0.7–2.9 centimetres (0.28–1.14 in) wide. The leaf stems are 1.5–8 centimetres (0.59–3.15 in) long.

The inflorescences are lax, and have eight to fifteen flowers. The inflorescence stems are 11–20 centimetres (4.3–7.9 in) long. The flowers are pink, and up to 2.5 centimetres (0.98 in) wide. The sepals are narrowly lanceolate, 1–1.4 centimetres (0.39–0.55 in) long, and 2.8–4.6 millimetres (0.11–0.18 in) wide. The petals are narrowly lanceolate, 9.5–13.7 millimetres (0.37–0.54 in) long, and 1.9–3.2 millimetres (0.075–0.126 in) wide. The labellum is 10.5–15 millimetres (0.41–0.59 in) long, 3.5 millimetres (0.14 in) wide, and has three lobes. The column is 1–1.2 centimetres (0.39–0.47 in) long. The plant flowers from October to January, and in April and August.

== Conservation ==
Spathoglottis hardingiana is listed in Appendix II of CITES. There are no quotas or suspensions in place for the species.

== Etymology ==
In the original description, Spathoglottis hardingiana is named as Spathoglottis handingiana, and is cited as being named after Herrn Coles-Handing. This is a misspelling of Herrn Coles-Harding.
