= Myitkyina Township =

Coordinates: 26.2500°N 97.5000°E

Myitkyina Township မြစ်ကြီးနားမြို့နယ်
- Township
- Location in Myitkyina district
- Country: Myanmar
- State: Kachin State
- District: Myitkyina District

Area
  - Total: 1,857.1 sq mi (4,809.9 km^{2})

Population (2014)
  - Total: 306,949
  - Density: 165.28/sq mi (63.816/km^{2})
- Time zone: UTC+6:30 (MST)

Myitkyina Township (Burmese: မြစ်ကြီးနားမြို့နယ်) is a township of Myitkyina District in Kachin State, Burma. The principal town is Myitkyina.

== Demographics ==
=== 2014 ===
Historical Population
Year	Pop.	±%
1973		—
1983		—
2014	306,949	—
Source: Ministry of Labor, Immigration, and Population data

The 2014 Myanmar Census reported that Myitkyina Township had a population of 306,949. The population density was 63.8 people per km^{2}. The census reported that the median age was 24.5 years, and 94 males per 100 females. There were 50,583 households; the mean household size was 5.4.
